= Villa Arrigona =

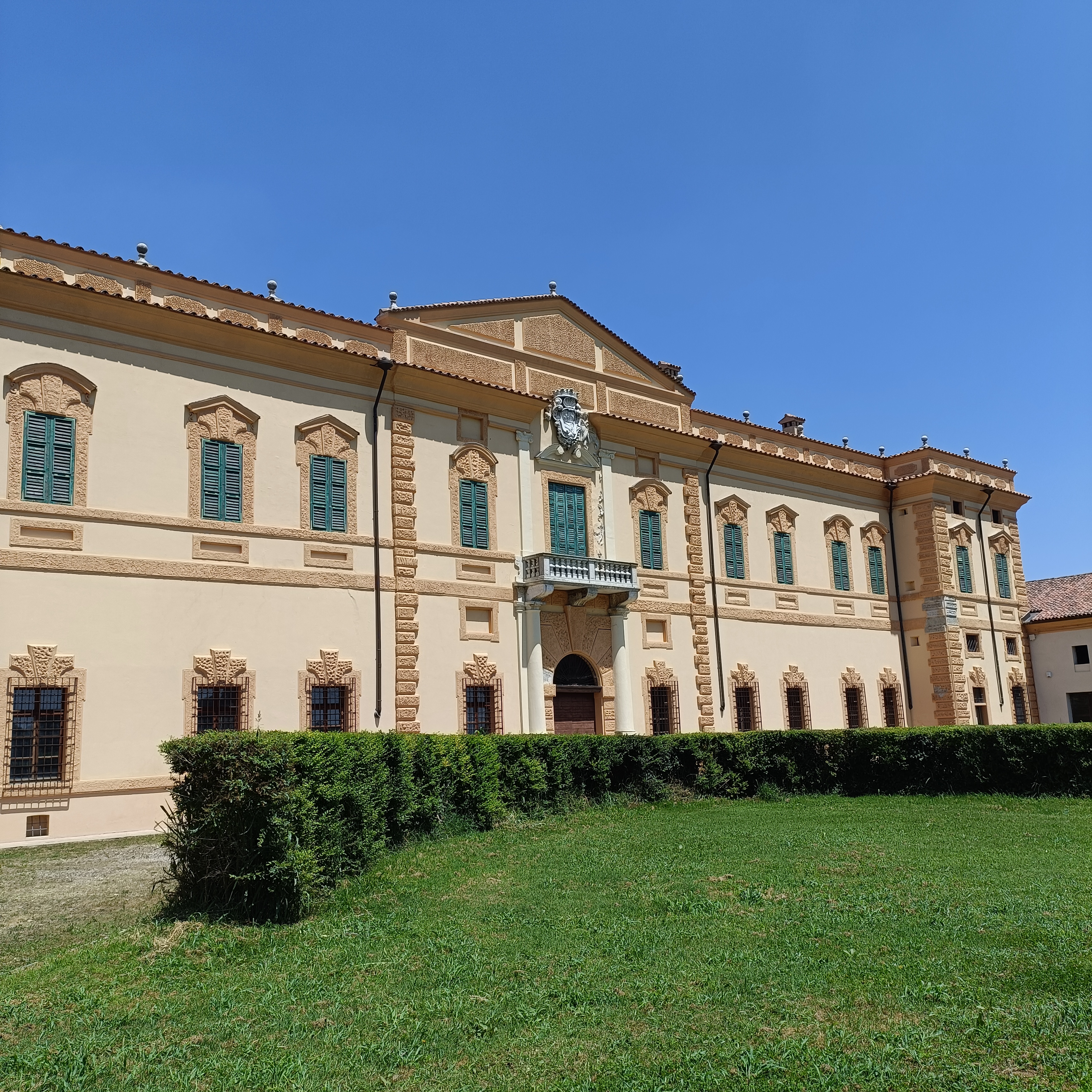
- Façade of Villa Arrigona
- Interactive map of the Villa Arrigona area

General information
- Location: San Giacomo delle Segnate, Italy
- Coordinates: 44°58′17″N 11°02′56″E
- Construction started: 1613
- Construction stopped: 1622

Design and construction
- Architect: Antonio Maria Viani

Villa Arrigona is a 17th-century villa in San Giacomo delle Segnate, in the Province of Mantua, Lombardy, Italy. Its main residence was built between 1613 and 1622 on the commission of Count Pompeo Arrigoni, son of Gerolamo, of the noble Arrigoni family, to designs by the Cremonese architect Antonio Maria Viani, prefect of the Gonzaga ducal works at Mantua; the wider complex, including the oratory, was developed subsequently, with a major enlargement in the 18th century. It is considered one of the most important villas of the province.

The villa stands about 1 kilometre (0.62 mi) from the town centre, on the road to Poggio Rusco, in the lower Mantuan plain.

== Description ==
The complex is made up of the 17th-century villa with its outbuildings (corpi di fabbrica), a late Baroque oratory, a park, and land that is still cultivated; its scale conveys the wealth and prestige of the Arrigoni family that commissioned it. The villa was a stately country residence, usually inhabited seasonally, distinct in type from both the town palace and the rural farm court. Built on two floors, its façade is characterized by a tympanum reminiscent of the Palazzo Te in Mantua, beneath which the large stone family coat of arms stands out.

== History ==
The attribution to Viani and the construction dates are based on archival research by Daniela Ferrari, director of the State Archive of Mantua, who received the Arrigoni family archive from Aliana Cavriani. Other works by Viani at Mantua include the churches of Sant'Orsola and San Maurizio, the law-courts palace (the former Palazzo Guerrieri), Duke Vincenzo's apartment in the Ducal Palace, and the hunting lodge at Bosco Fontana.

In the 18th century the central block was enlarged with further buildings devoted to agricultural activity, ordered by Tommaso Arrigoni, prefect of the Mantuan academy of painting, architecture, and sculpture; through him the villa was associated with artists including Francesco Maria Raineri (known as lo Schivenoglia), Giuseppe Bazzani (whose Martyrdom of Saint Thomas came from the villa's oratory), and the Bibiena, who designed a park behind the villa that no longer exists. At its height the estate formed a self-contained community: the flourishing farm provided local employment, and among the buildings were a small church and lodgings for the medico condotto (the parish doctor).

The estate later passed by marriage from the Arrigoni to the Cavriani and then to the Sordi family, who continue to own it.

== 2012 earthquake and reconstruction ==
Having recently been restored by the owning Sordi family, the villa was severely damaged by the earthquakes of 20 and 29 May 2012, only shortly before a planned opening to the public; it was declared unfit for habitation.

The restoration was among the most complex and costly post-earthquake projects in the Mantua area. The Region of Lombardy allocated more than €4.5 million in state reconstruction funds, supplemented by contributions from the owners. The villa was inaugurated on its reopening in September 2019 by the president of the Region of Lombardy, Attilio Fontana, acting in his capacity as post-earthquake commissioner; it was intended to resume a role in community life by hosting conferences and cultural events.

== Sources ==
- Sordi, M. Giuseppina, Villa Arrigona in San Giacomo delle Segnate, Editoriale Sometti, Mantua, 2002, 48 pp., ill. ISBN 978-88-88091-77-8
- Sordi, M. Giuseppina, Villa Arrigona. Quattro secoli di storia alle Segnate, Mantua, 2013. ISBN 978-88-95490-19-9
- Giovan Battista di Crollalanza, Dizionario storico blasonico delle famiglie nobili o notabili italiane estinte e fiorenti, vol. 1, Bologna, 1886.
