= Giovanni Cadioli =

Italian painter

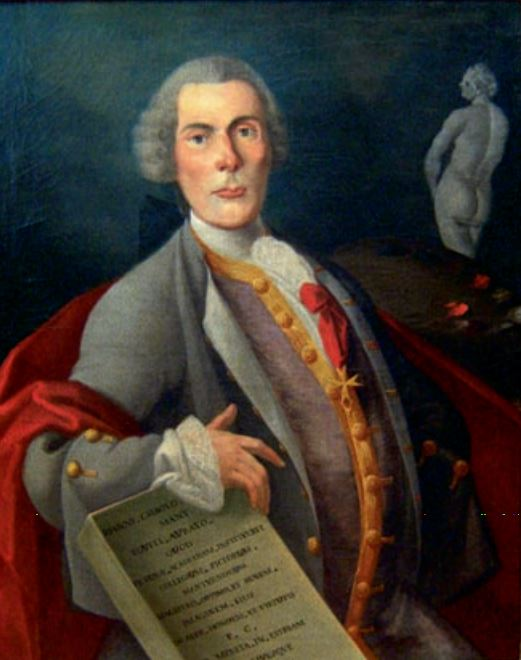
- Born: around 1710; Mantua
- Died: 10 September 1767; Mantua
- Education: Giovanni Canti
- Known for: Painting and Architecture
- Movement: Baroque

Giovanni Cadioli (c. 1710 – 10 September 1767) was an Italian painter of the Baroque, active mainly in his native Mantua, Duchy of Mantua. He was also an author of a guide to artworks in this city.

== Biography ==
He was a pupil of Giovanni Canti, along with Giuseppe Bazzani and Francesco Maria Raineri. He excelled in painting landscapes. He painted The Alms of San Guerrino both for the Church of Sant’Egidio in Mantua. In 1746, he completed a series of monochrome paintings about the ‘’Life of St Hippolytus’’ for the church of Gazoldo degli Ippoliti. In 1748 he was appointed painter and architect of the Royal Ducal Theatre of Mantua. In 1752 established the Academy of Fine Arts of Mantua, and later became its director. He painted frescoes in Abbey of San Benedetto in Polirone between 1750 and 1760. Among his pupils was Giacomo Gatti.
