= Ognissanti =

Ognissanti (All Saints) may refer to one of the following Italian churches:

- Ognissanti, Florence, Tuscany
- Ognissanti, Mantua, Lombardy
- Ognissanti, Trani, Apulia
- Ognissanti, Venice, Veneto

Also may refer into the following buildings and structures:

- Porta Ognissanti, Padua, Veneto
