= San Maurizio =

San Maurizio is the Italian form of Saint Maurice, the Nubian leader of the legendary Roman Theban Legion. He has lent his name to a number of buildings and places in Italy.

== Buildings ==
- San Maurizio (Mocrone), a small church in Mocrone, near Villafranca in Lunigiana in the Province of Massa-Carrara
- San Maurizio al Monastero Maggiore, a church in Milan
- San Maurizio (Mantua), a church in Mantua
- San Maurizio (Monza), a church in Monza
- San Maurizio, Venice, a church in Venice

== Places ==
- St.Moritz/San Maurizio, a town in Switzerland
- San Maurizio Canavese, a commune of the Province of Turin
- San Maurizio d'Opaglio, a commune of the Province of Novara
- San Maurizio (Reggio Emilia) a quarter of Reggio Emilia
- San Maurizio al Lambro, a frazione of Cologno Monzese, Province of Milan
- San Maurizio (Brunate), a frazione of Brunate, Province of Como
- San Maurizio (Conzano), a frazione of Conzano in the Province of Alessandria
