= Ognissanti, Mantua =

Church building in Mantua, Italy

Coordinates: 45°9′26″N 10°46′58″E

Church of Ognissanti
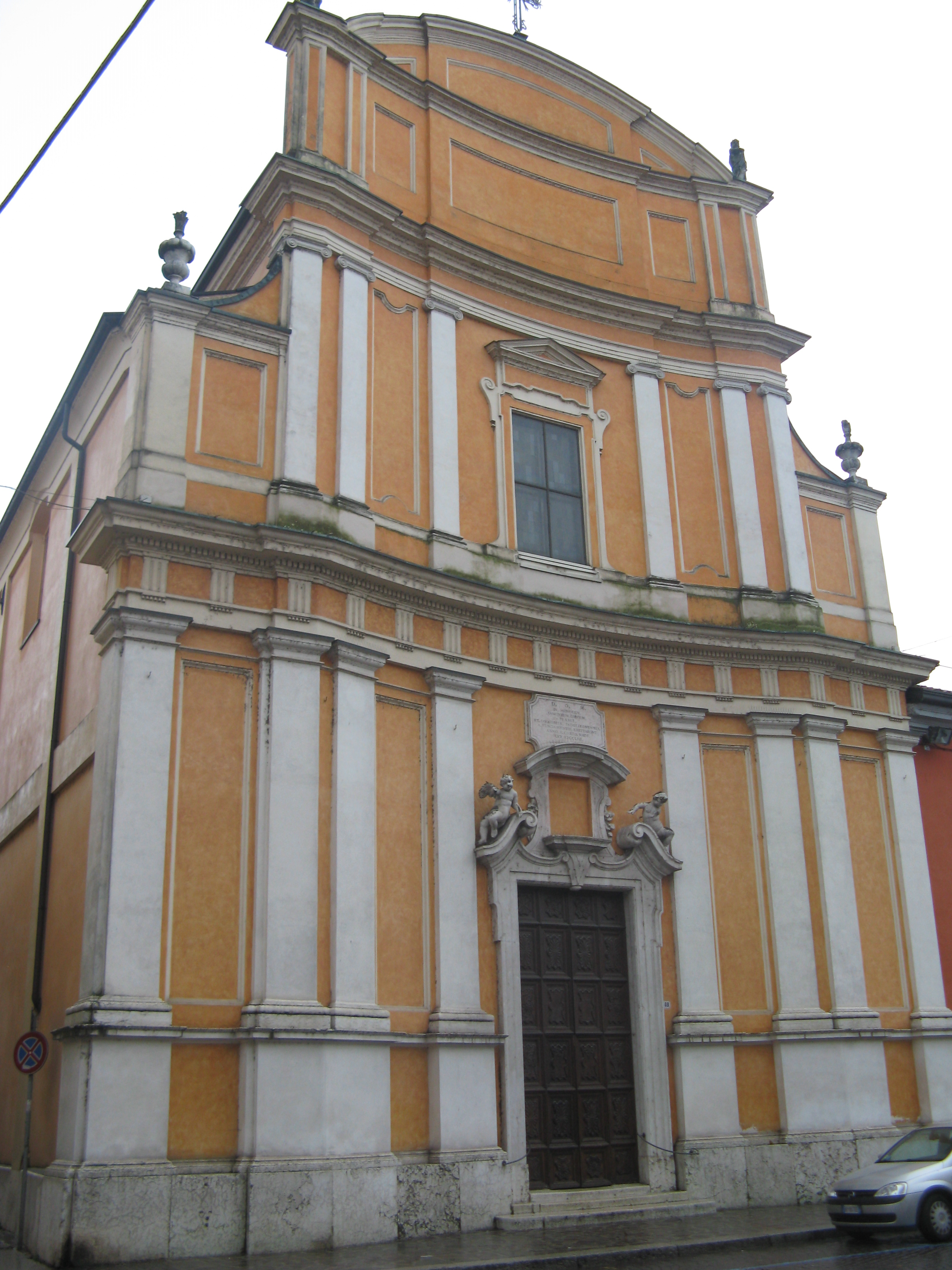
- Facade

Religion
- Affiliation: Roman Catholic

Location
- Location: Mantua, Italy
- Interactive map of Church of Ognissanti

Architecture
- Type: Church
- Style: Baroque
- Groundbreaking: 12th century
- Completed: 1752-1755

Website
- www.ognissantisanbarnaba.it

The Ognissanti is a Baroque style, Roman Catholic church located on Corso Vittorio Emanuele in Mantua, Lombardy, Italy.

== History ==
It is reputed that Matilde of Canossa granted the Ognissanti church around 1080 to the Abbey of Polirone in San Benedetto Po. Others ascribe the donation to the Benedictines as a gift by Pope Adrian IV in 1159.

The present church and façade were completed by 1755, creating a new church with stood at right angles to the original structure. The belltower and the chapel of the dead retain some of the original Romanesque architecture. In 1797, the order was suppressed by the Napoleonic occupation and the church briefly deconsecrated.

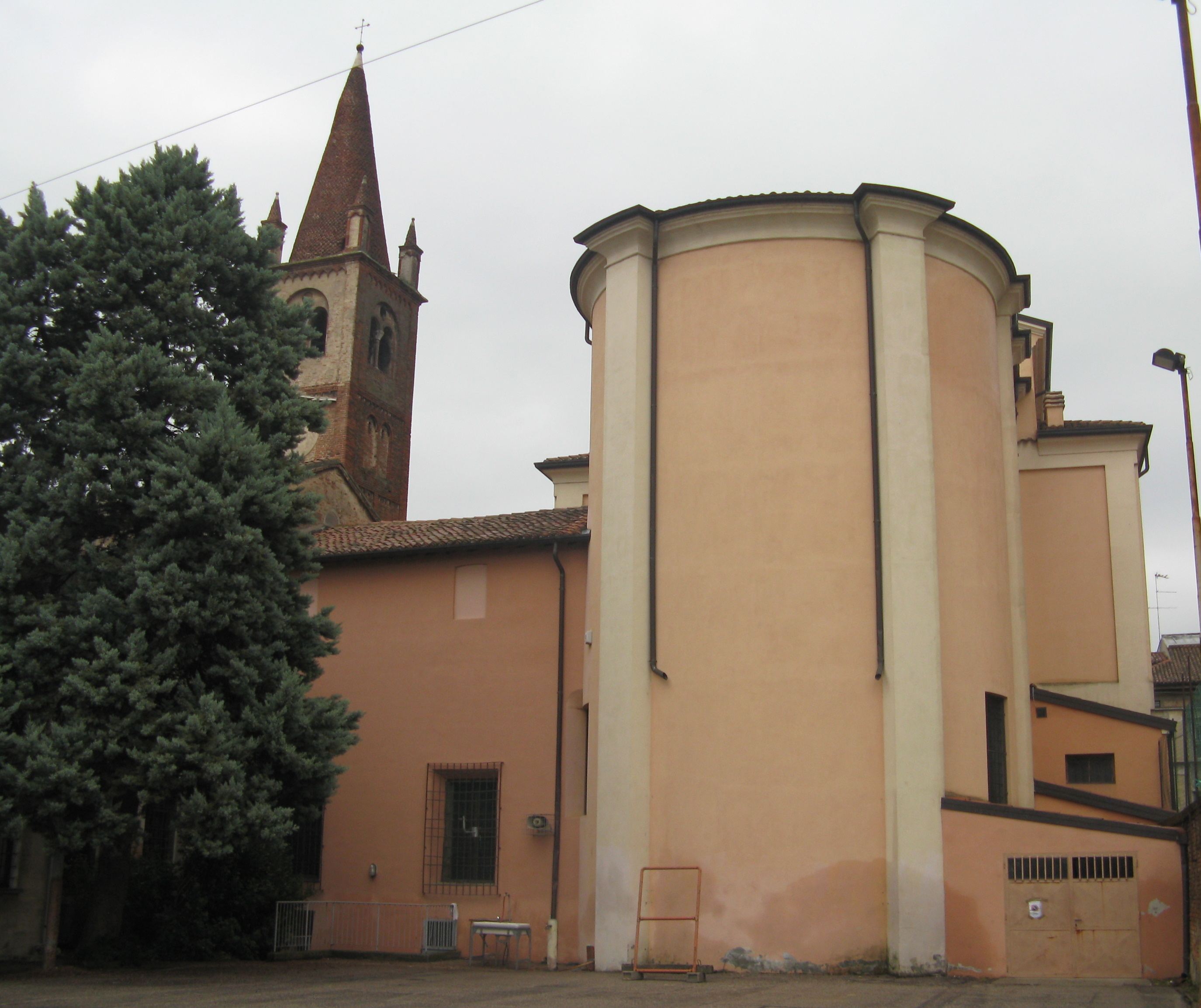
Belltower and side-view

The interior contains the following artworks:

- St Benedetto and St Scolastica surrounded by Saints and Angels by Ippolito Andreasi in presbytery.
- Presentation of John the Baptist, altarpiece, by Ippolito Andreasi.
- Madonna with Child and St Anne, altarpiece by Giuseppe Bazzani.
- St Mauro healing the Sick by Giovanni Cadioli.
- Crowned Madonna and Child with St Benedetto, St John the Baptist and two donors, by Nicolò Solimani da Verona from 1463 found in Chapel of the Dead.

== Sources ==
- Arte fede storia. Le chiese di Mantova e provincia, Roberto Brunelli - Gianfranco Ferlisi - Irma Pagliari - Giuseppina Pastore, Edizioni Tre Lune, Mantova (2004)
