= Profile of a Man (Mantegna) =

Painting attributed to Andrea Mantegna

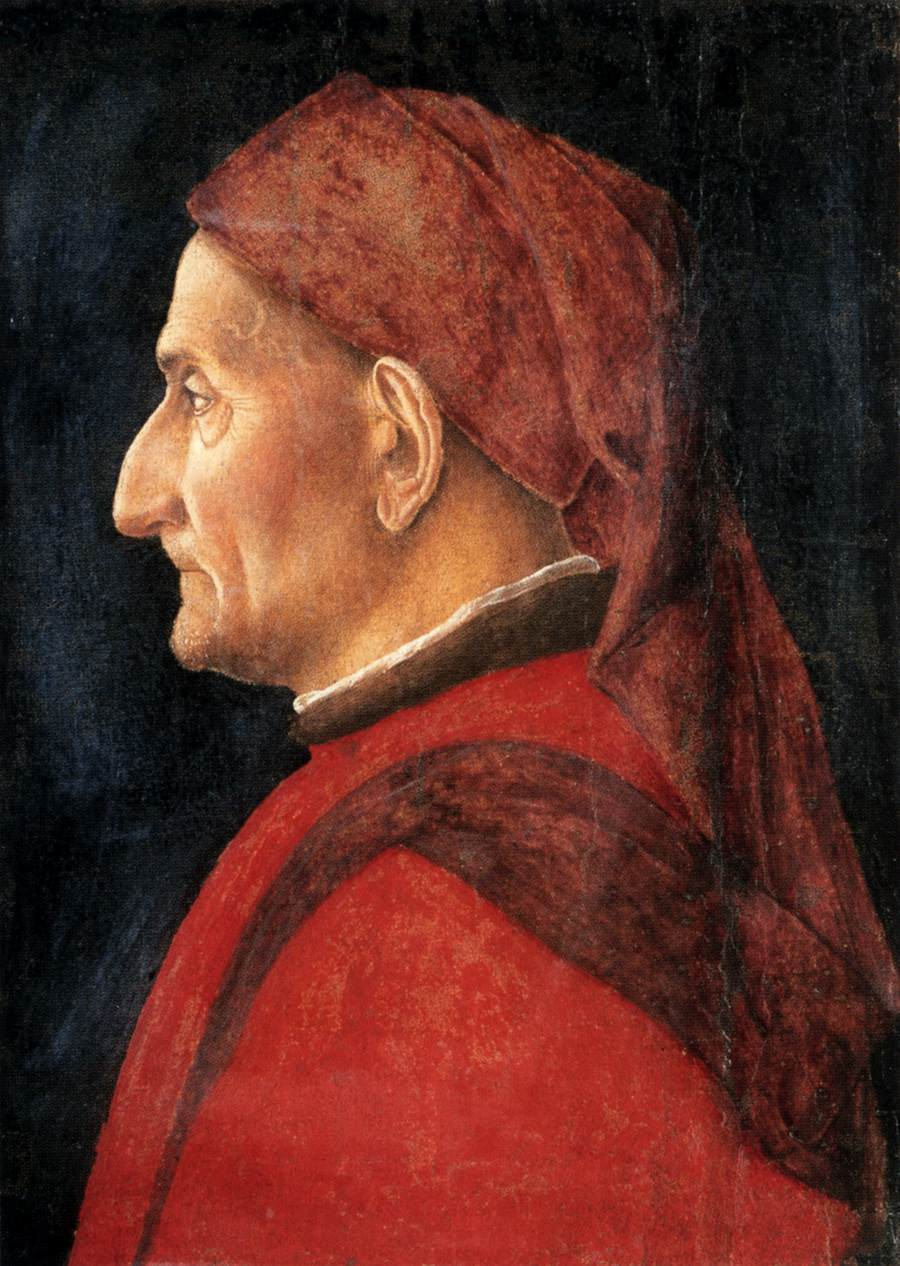
- Artist: Andrea Mantegna
- Year: between 1448-1450 and 1460-1462
- Medium: tempera on panel
- Dimensions: 32.3 cm × 28.8 cm (12.7 in × 11.3 in)
- Location: Museo Poldi Pezzoli, Milan

Profile of a Man or Male Portrait is a tempera painting on panel, Museo Poldi Pezzoli in Milan. It is attributed to Andrea Mantegna, though its dating and attribution are uncertain. Some have attributed it to Cosmè Tura, Francesco Bonsignori and others, though it is now more usually attributed to Mantegna, either from his stay in Ferrara in 1448-50 (revealing the influence of Rogier van der Weyden - he may have met him or seen his work there) or from his arrival in Mantua in 1460 (where he was given various portrait commissions). The subject is unknown, though his costume and hat suggest a Venetian magistrate, a lawyer or a nobleman.
