= San Giacomo delle Segnate =

San Giacomo delle Segnate San Iàcum dli Sgnàdi (Emilian)
- Comune
- Comune di San Giacomo delle Segnate
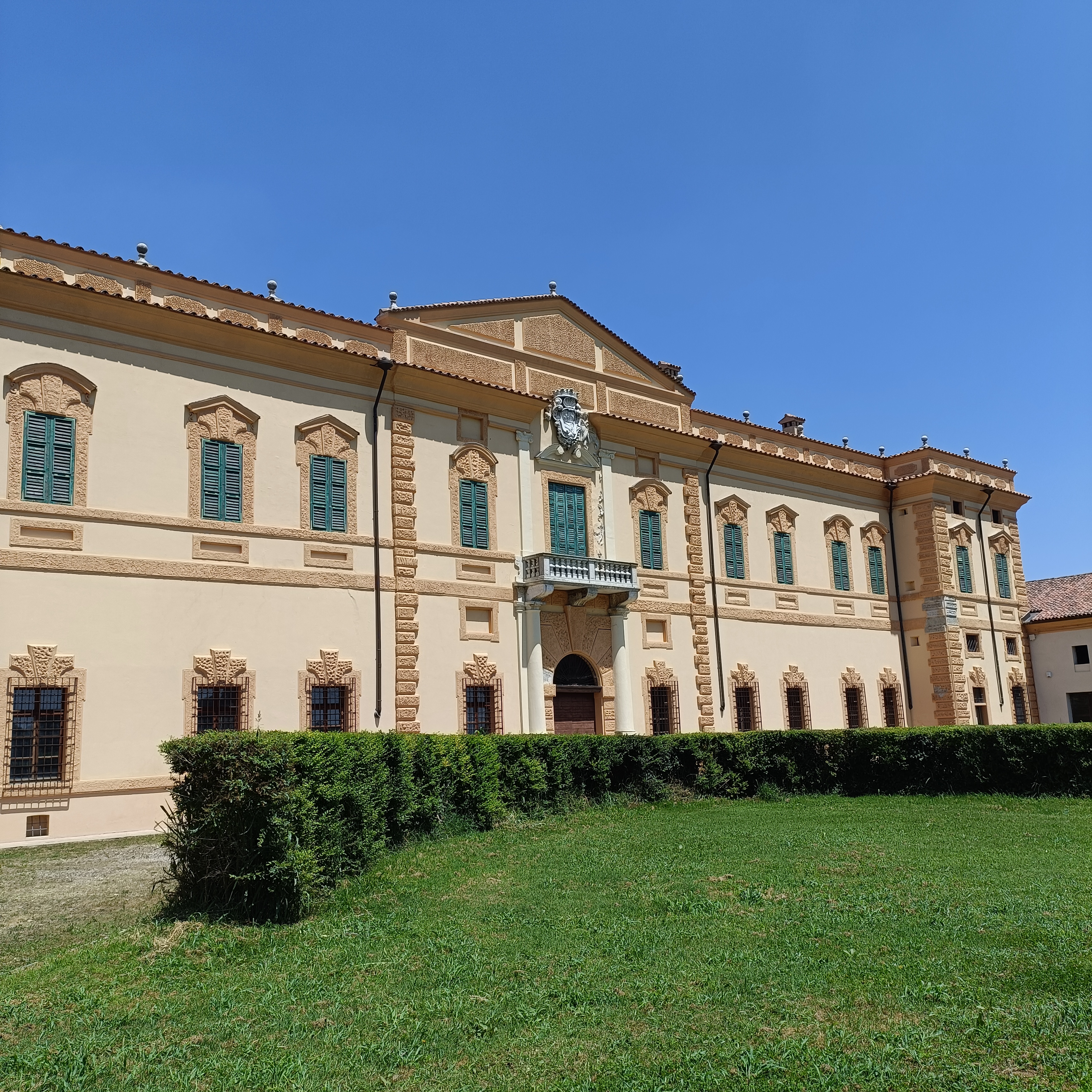
- Villa Arrigona

- Location within Italy Location within Lombardy
- Coordinates: 44°58′N 11°2′E
- Country: Italy
- Region: Lombardy
- Province: Mantua (MN)
- Frazioni: Malcantone

Government
  - Mayor: Giuseppe Brandani

Area
  - Total: 15.98 km^{2} (6.17 sq mi)
- Elevation: 16 m (52 ft)

Population (30 November 2016)
  - Total: 1,598
  - Density: 100.0/km^{2} (259.0/sq mi)
- Demonym: Sangiacomesi
- Time zone: UTC+1 (CET)
  - Summer (DST): UTC+2 (CEST)
- Postal code: 46020
- Dialing code: 0376
- Patron saint: Saint James the Greater
- Saint day: 25 July

San Giacomo delle Segnate (Lower Mantovano: San Iàcum dli Sgnàdi) is a comune (municipality) in the Province of Mantua in the Italian region Lombardy, located about 160 kilometres (99 mi) southeast of Milan and about 30 kilometres (19 mi) southeast of Mantua. A small rural settlement of the lower Mantuan plain, it lies in the Oltrepò mantovano, in the reclaimed lowlands on the right bank of the Secchia river, near the boundary with both the Province of Modena and the Emilia-Romagna region.

== Geography ==
San Giacomo delle Segnate sits at an elevation of 16 metres (52 ft) in the flat, intensively farmed countryside of the lower Mantuan plain, an area drained from former marshland by land-reclamation works. The municipal territory includes the frazione (hamlet) of Malcantone.

San Giacomo delle Segnate borders the following municipalities: Concordia sulla Secchia, Quistello, and San Giovanni del Dosso.

== History ==
At least part of the present municipal territory is thought to have formed part of the endowments with which Tedald of the House of Canossa founded the Benedictine abbey of San Benedetto in Polirone in 1007. The manor of "Signada" and its surrounding district, previously within the orbit of the county of Reggio and the Canossa fief of Bondeno di Roncore, passed under the jurisdiction of the abbey and the castle of Quistello around the middle of the 13th century.

In 1494 Lucrezia Pico of Mirandola settled at the court of the Segnate together with her husband Gherardo Felice Appiano d'Aragona, count of Montagano, Casacalenda and Limosano. Apart from such brief interruptions, the territory remained a Benedictine and Mantuan possession, held by the House of Gonzaga until 1707.

Following the Third Italian War of Independence and the 1866 plebiscite that joined the Veneto and the province of Mantua to the Kingdom of Italy, San Giacomo delle Segnate became a frazione of the comune of Quistello. Under the law of 10 August 1922, the autonomous comune of San Giacomo delle Segnate was established in 1924, with a population of about 3,160, of whom roughly 900 lived in the town centre and the remainder in the surrounding countryside. The local economy has long been, and remains, predominantly agricultural, with associated small craft workshops.

=== Toponymy ===
The name is generally held to derive from the role of a frontier "marker" (Italian segnatura di confine) played over the centuries by the manor (Signata Superior) and the district around the tower (Signata Inferior). The dedication to Saint James appeared more than two centuries after these earlier settlements, when the first parish church dedicated to James the Apostle was built shortly after 1450.

== Symbols ==
The town's coat of arms and gonfalone were granted by decree of the President of the Republic on 23 March 1954. The arms depict an oak tree standing on green ground between two watercourses (the Bondeno and the Burana) and flanked by the gold letters S and B. According to a Lombard tradition, such a tree was "marked" to serve as a guardian of agricultural boundaries; the letters stand for Saint Benedict of Nursia, recalling the monks of the Polirone abbey who first drained the surrounding marshes to make them arable.

== Main sights ==
=== Church of San Giacomo Apostolo ===
The parish church of San Giacomo Apostolo stands in the main square of the town. An earlier church on the site dates from the mid-15th century; the present building was reconstructed between 1778 and 1784, and its bell tower was raised between 1925 and 1929. The church and the centre of the town were damaged by Allied bombing in April 1945 and subsequently restored.

=== Villa Arrigona ===
The main residence of Villa Arrigona was built between 1613 and 1622 for Count Pompeo Arrigoni, son of Gerolamo, of the noble Arrigoni family, to designs by the Cremonese architect Antonio Maria Viani, prefect of the ducal works and already in the service of the Gonzagas of Mantua; the wider complex was enlarged in the 18th century. It is considered one of the most important villas of the province of Mantua.

The villa, made up of several buildings, was a stately country residence usually inhabited seasonally. Built on two floors with an adjoining late Baroque oratory, park, and cultivated land, its façade is characterized by a tympanum reminiscent of Palazzo Te, beneath which the large stone family coat of arms stands out.
