= Giacomo Gatti =

Italian painter

Giacomo Gatti (born mid-18th century, died 1817) was an Italian painter of the late Baroque, active mainly in his native Mantua.

He was a pupil of Giovanni Cadioli (died 1767) at the Academy of Art in Mantua. He is best known for painting landscapes and ornament as decoration for frescoes. He worked in the house of Marchese Castiglioni in Mantua and his villa at Casatico.
