= Jacopo Borbone =

Italian painter

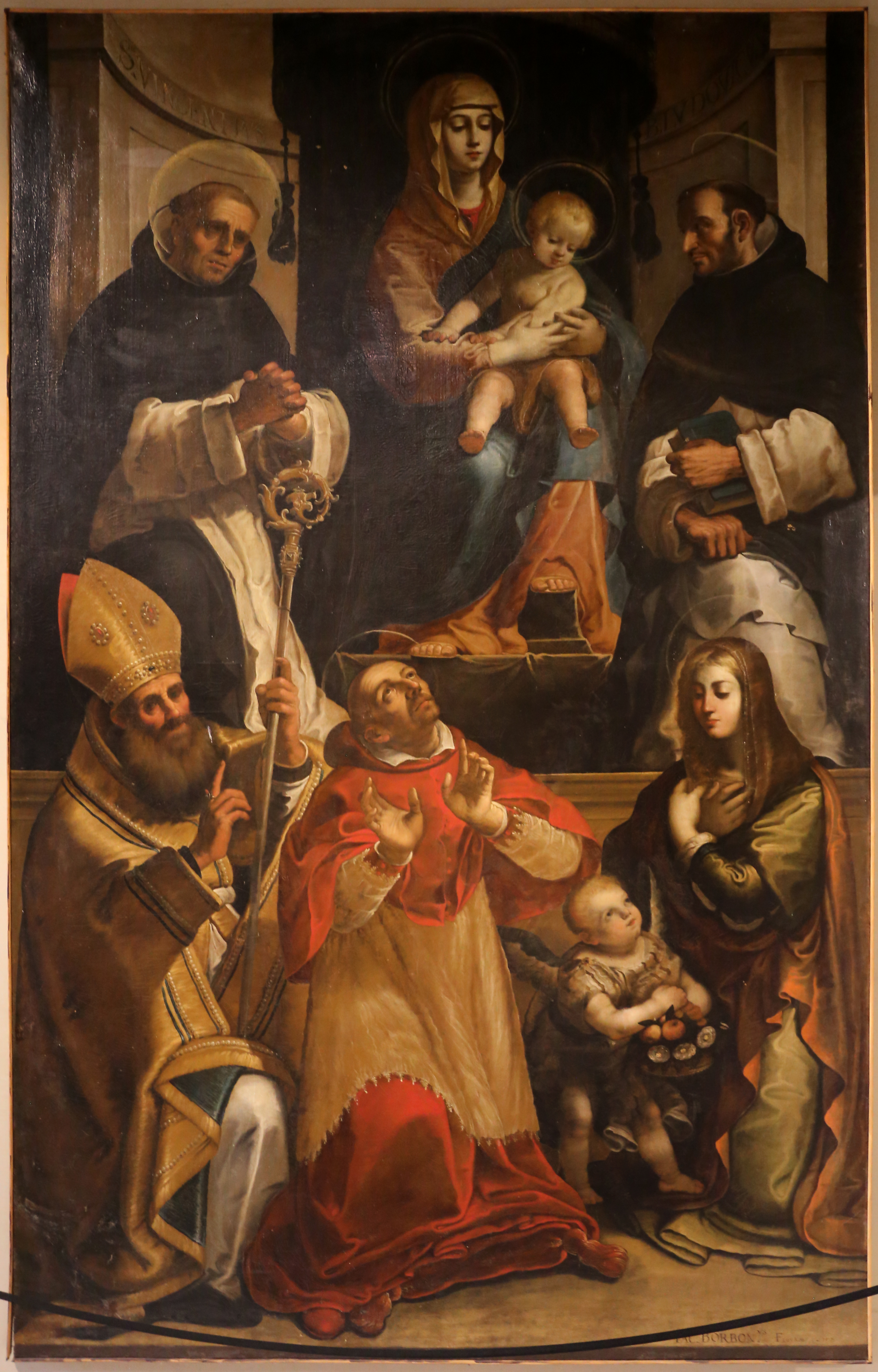
Madonna and Saints, palazzo Ducale, Mantua

Jacopo Borbone (Novellara, active early 17th century) was an Italian painter of the Mannerist period.

He is supposed to have trained with Lelio Orsi while the latter lived in Novellara. He was active mainly in Mantua. In the year 1614, painted a portion of the cloister at the church of the Osservanti in Mantua. He painted the altarpiece of the Annunciation for the church of San Maurizio in Mantua. In 1616, he painted a series of frescoes for the church of Santi Fabiano e Sebastiano in San Martino dall'Argine.
