= San Barnaba, Mantua =

Church in Mantua, Italy

Coordinates: 45.1540°N 10.7869°E

Church of San Barnaba
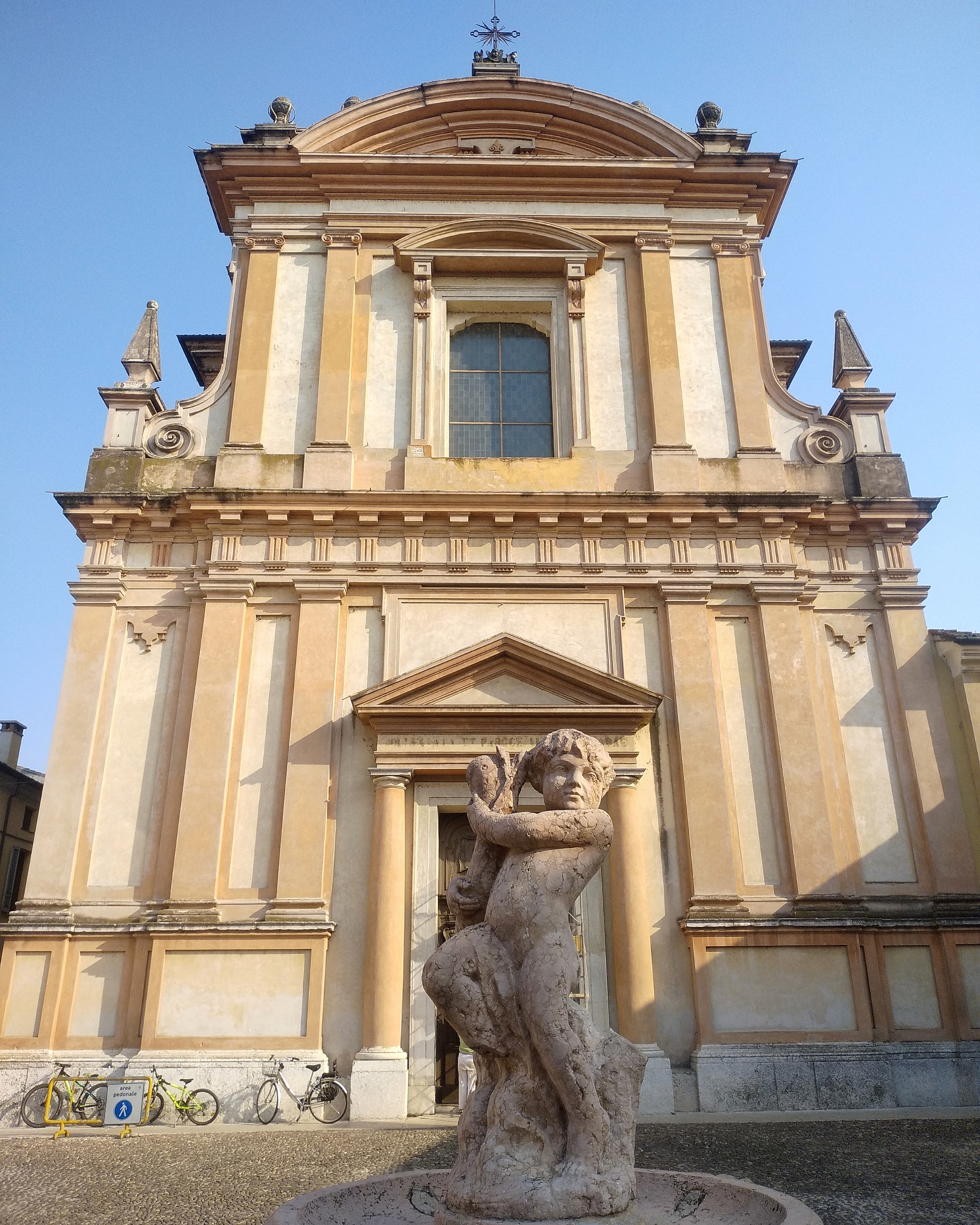
- Facade

Religion
- Affiliation: Roman Catholic

Location
- Location: Mantua, Italy
- Interactive map of Church of San Barnaba

Architecture
- Type: Church
- Style: Baroque
- Completed: 18th century

San Barnaba is a Roman Catholic church located at the intersection of Via Giovanni Chiassi and Via Carlo Poma in Mantua, Lombardy, Italy.

== History ==
The first church at the site was dedicated to St Barnabas, the first bishop of Milan, and was noted at the site by 1263. The church was provided by Francesco I Gonzaga in 1397 to a convent of nuns of the Servite Order. In 1724, the church was rebuilt with a new façade designed by the architect Antonio Galli Bibiena. The adjacent cloister was destroyed in 1900.

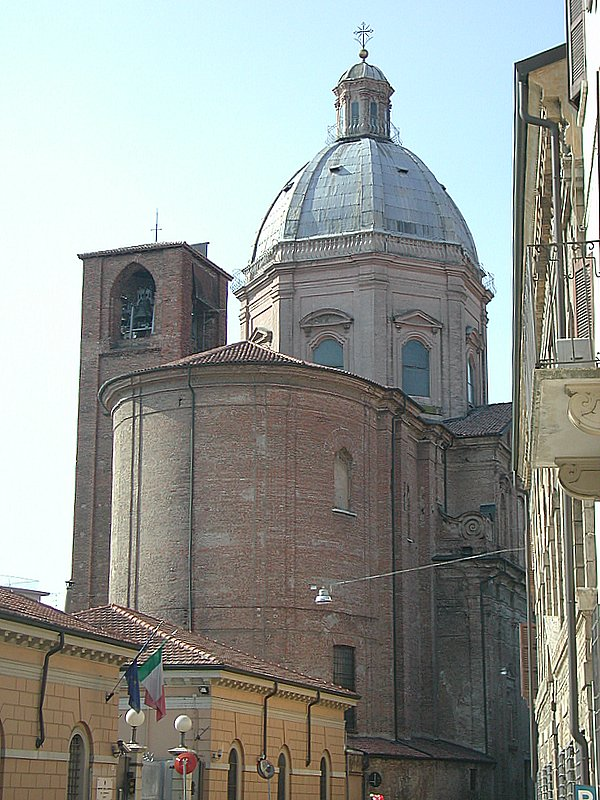
San Barnaba - Dome

The interior contains the following works:

- Via Crucis by Giuseppe Bazzani
- Salvator Mundi, presbytery fresco by Teodoro Ghisi
- Madonna with Child and St Filippo Benizzi by Bernardino Malpizzi
- Miracle of the Fish and Loaves of Bread (1582-1583) by Lorenzo Costa the younger
- Effigy of St Filippo Benizzi (1730) by Giuseppe Orioli (third altar on left)
- Marriage at Cana (late 16th century) by Alessandro Maganza
- Madonna and Child by Girolamo Bonsignori
- Beata Elisabetta of Mantua (15th-century fresco) by Bartolomea Picenardi

== Bibliography ==
Roberto Brunelli, "Arte Fede e Storia-le chiese di Mantova e provincia", Tre lune, Mantova 2004
