= Santa Maria della Carità, Mantua =

Coordinates: 45.1563°N 10.7940°E

Santa Maria della Carità is a Baroque-style, Roman Catholic church located on Via Corridoni #33 in Mantua, region of Lombardy, Italy.

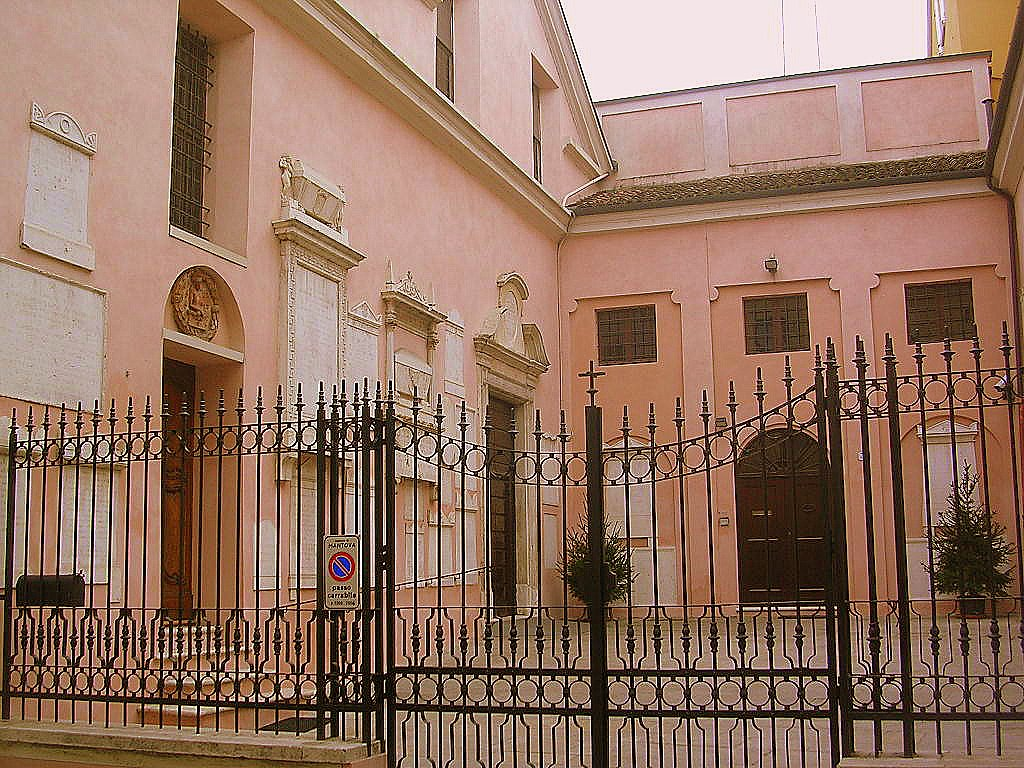
Church façade

== History ==
A church at the site is documented from the year 984. The church was affiliated with the jewelers of the city. In 1613 it underwent reconstruction, and achieved its present shape in 1752.

Added to the facades of the church and surrounding buildings, which face a small piazza next to the street, are numerous inscriptions from a cemetery once found at the site. The interior includes baroque decoration, and includes eleven paintings by Giuseppe Bazzani who was baptized here in 1690.

== Interior artworks ==
- Theological Virtues, nave ceiling canvases by Giuseppe Bazzani
- Jesus among the Doctors and Jesus scatters the merchants from the Temple, Francesco Maria Raineri
- St Michael Archangel and Saints Cosma and Damiano, main altarpiece by Giovanni Francesco Caroto
- Madonna and Child and Saints by Giovanni Canti

A guide from 1866 mentions at least two paintings by Giuseppe Razzetti.

== Bibliography ==
- Cesare Cantù, Grande illustrazione del Lombardo-Veneto, ossia, Storia delle città, dei borghi, comuni, castelli ecc. fino ai tempi moderni, Milan 1859
- Mantua tourism office.
- Structured according to Italian Wikipedia entry.
