= San Maurizio (Mantua) =

Church in Mantua, Italy

Coordinates: 45.1559°N 10.7886°E

Church of San Maurizio
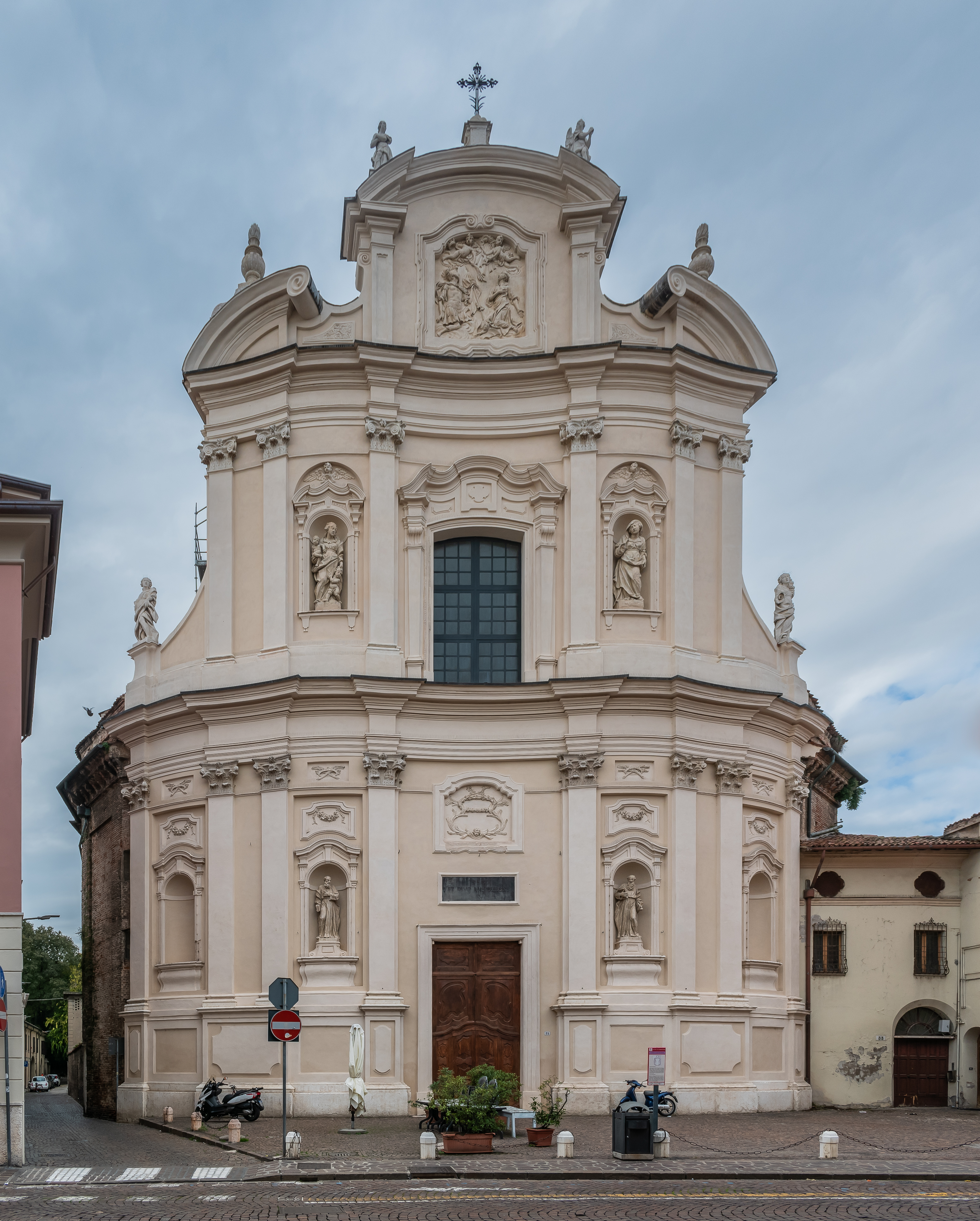
- Facade

Religion
- Affiliation: Roman Catholic

Location
- Location: Mantua, Italy
- Interactive map of Church of San Maurizio

Architecture
- Type: Church
- Style: Baroque
- Completed: 18th century

San Maurizio is a domed Baroque, Roman Catholic church designed by Antonio Maria Viani, and located on Via Chiassi, Mantua, Italy. It was once called ‘’Santi Maurizio e Margherita’’.

== History ==
The church was consecrated in 1616, as part of an adjacent Theatine convent. The present façade was constructed in 1731. During the Napoleonic occupation, it was given the satirical name of St Napoleon. After Austrian rule of the region, the church became attached to the parish of Santa Barnaba. Damaged during the Second World War, the church has been closed from 1957 to 2007, when it was opened for worship only on the day of Virgo Fidelis. The first chapel on the left contains the tomb of Giovanni dalle Bande Nere. It is also open for viewing of artworks on certain days. The tomb of Giulio Romano was lost during reconstructions of the past centuries.

== Principal art works ==
Presently the church still contains the following works of art.

- Martyrdom of St Margaret (1616) by Ludovico Carracci.
- Exaltation of the Cross by Frans Geffels.
- Annunciation by Jacopo Borbone.
- Martydom of Santa Felicita by Lorenzo Garbieri (1580-1654).
- Murder of the children of Santa Felicita by Lorenzo Garbieri.
- Seven large canvases in the presbytery painted by the Flemish artist Jacob Denys, including an Apparition of Madonna and Child to Saints Margaret and Maurice and Blessed Theatines.
- Madonna with Child, and Saints Maurice and Margaret by an unknown artist.
