= Sant'Egidio (Mantua) =

Church in Mantua, Italy

Coordinates: 45.1534°N 10.7945°E

Church of Sant'Egidio
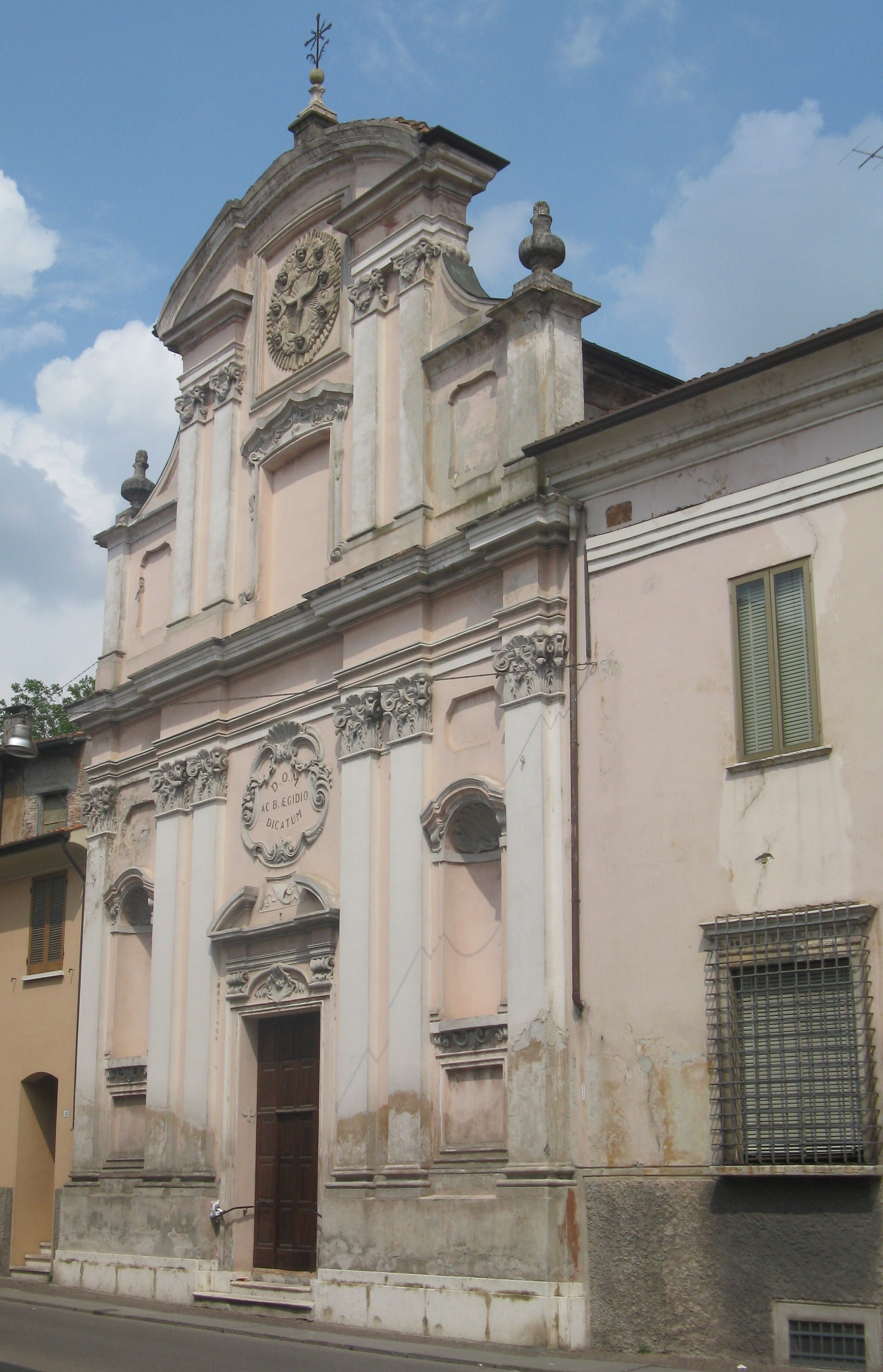

Religion
- Affiliation: Roman Catholic

Location
- Location: Mantua, Italy
- Interactive map of Church of Sant'Egidio

Architecture
- Type: Church
- Style: Baroque
- Groundbreaking: Reconstruction in 1721
- Completed: 1787

Website
- parrocchia di Sant'Egidio

The Church of Sant'Egidio (Italian: Chiesa di Sant'Egidio) is located in the historic center of Mantua on Via Pietro Frattini. A church was located on the site likely by the 9th century, but is documented from the year 1151 in a bull by Pope Eugenius III. In 1540, the chapel of the Valenti was built, commissioned by the last will of Valente Valenti, courtier in the Gonzaga Duchy. Beginning in 1721, the church underwent a major reconstruction, and the present facade dates to that time. In 1777, the cardinal Luigi Valenti reconstructed the family chapel.

The interior, mainly the semicircular apse, contains the following canvases:

- Martyrdom of St Vincenzo Levita (1776), by Giuseppe Bottani
- Martyrdom of St Vincenzo Ferrer (1773), by Giovanni Bottani, brother of the above
- Madonna of the Rosary (1777), by Vincenzo Borroni
- Altarpiece of Charity of St Guerrino (1736-1742) by Giovanni Cadioli
- Altarpiece of Madonna, Child, St Dominic and the Blessed Osanna Andreasi, (1593), attributed to Teodoro Ghisi
