= Antonio Maria Viani =

Italian painter

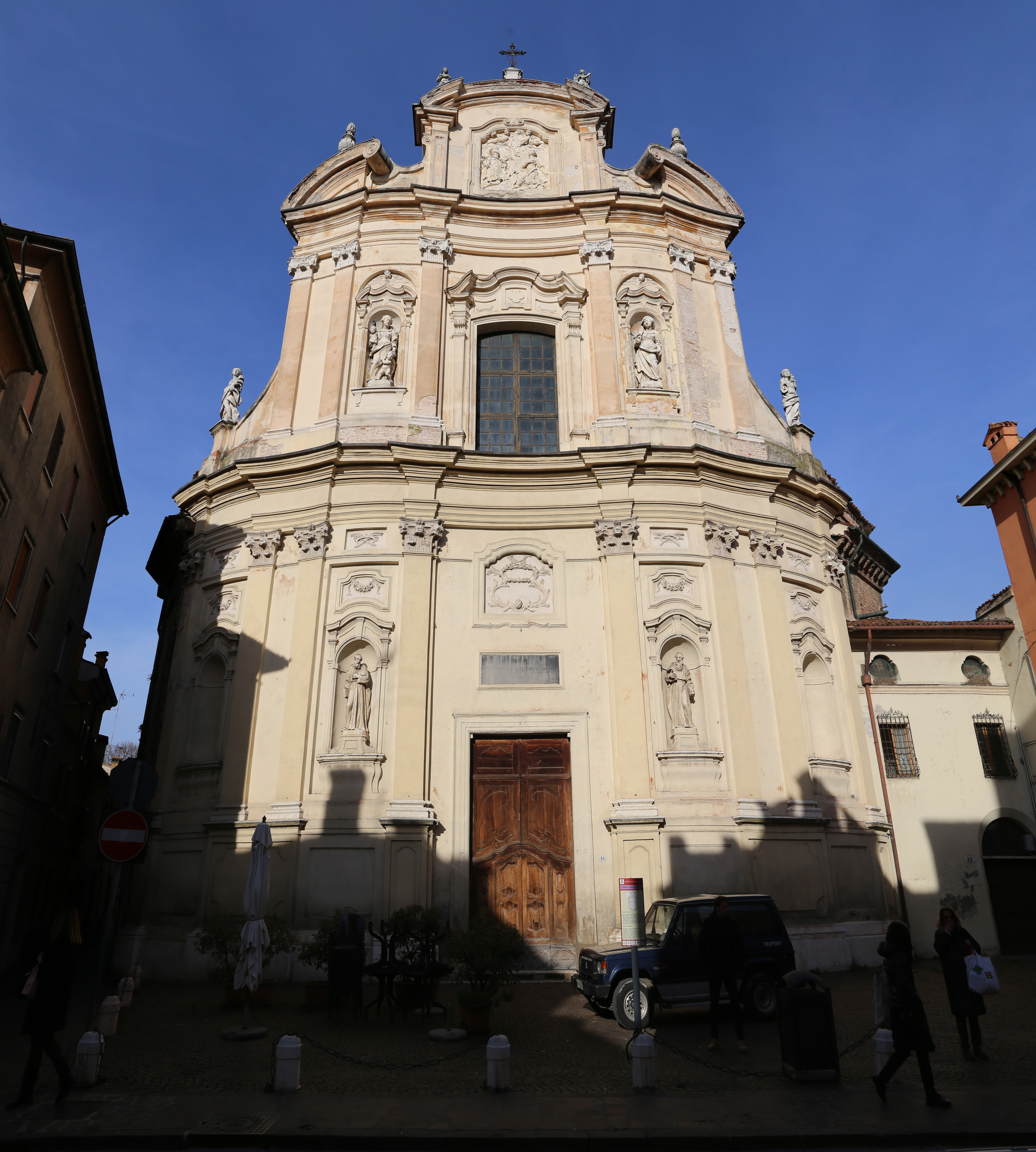
Mantua, St. Maurizio Church.

Antonio Maria Viani (born c. 1540) (also called Vianino) was an Italian painter, architect and carver of the Renaissance period. He was born in Cremona and was a pupil of Campi, as well as a court painter to Duke Vincenzo I Gonzaga, and adorned the large gallery of the Ducal Palace at Mantua with groups of children. One of his most important works is the impressive Villa Arrigona. He worked also at Capua and later died in Mantua at a very advanced age.

== Gallery ==
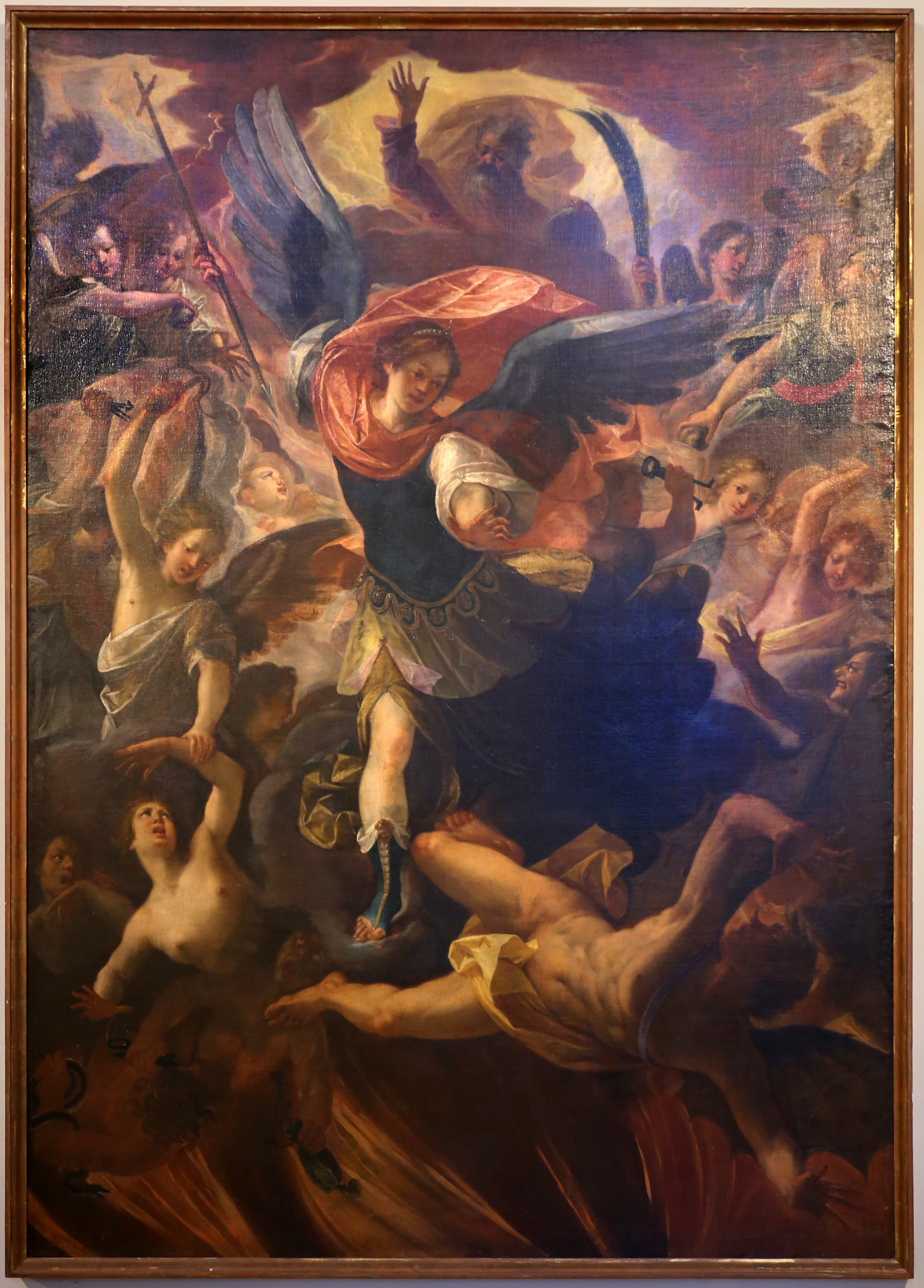
Archangel Michael Defeats Lucifer, 1594

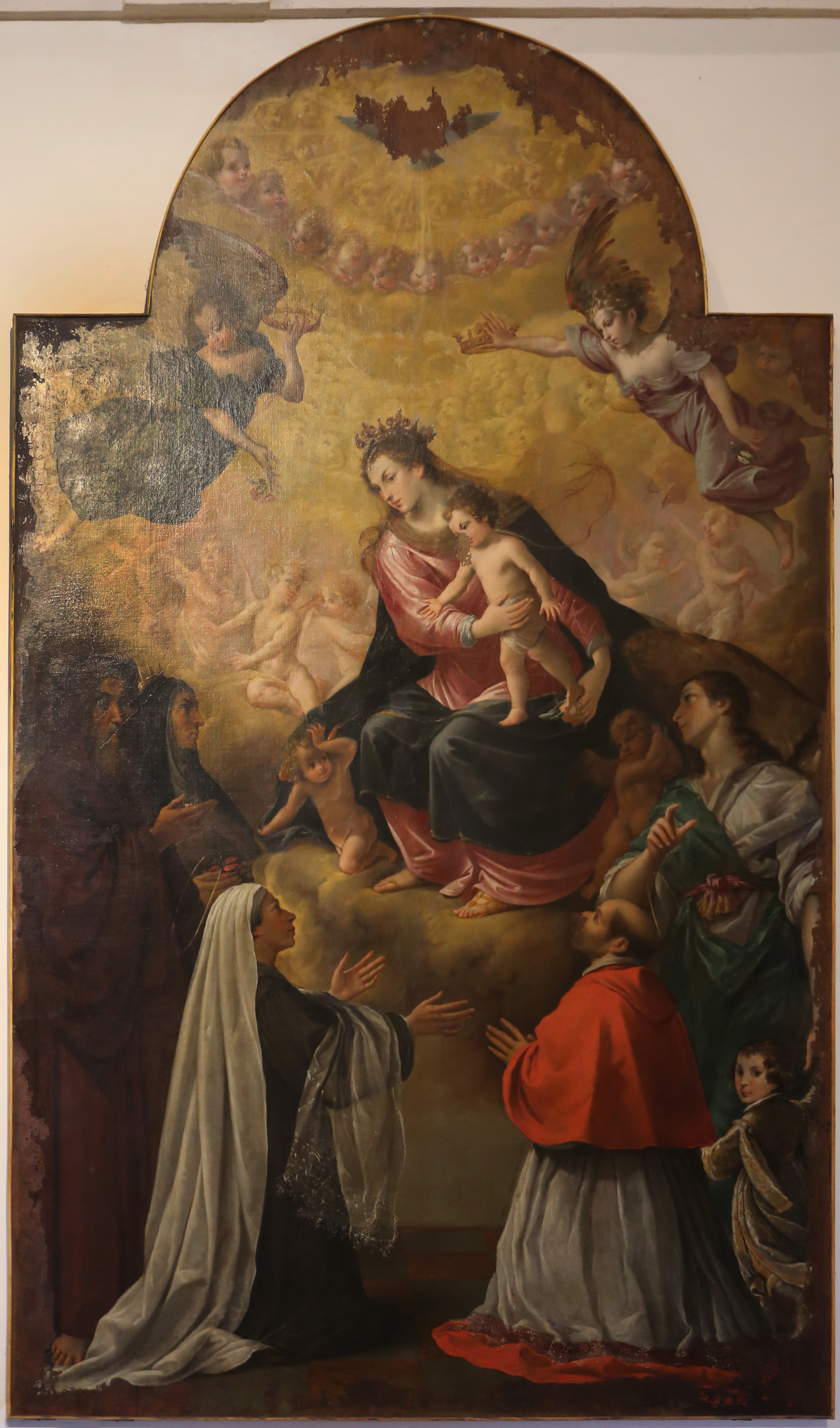
Madonna and Child with Saints, circa 1620-25

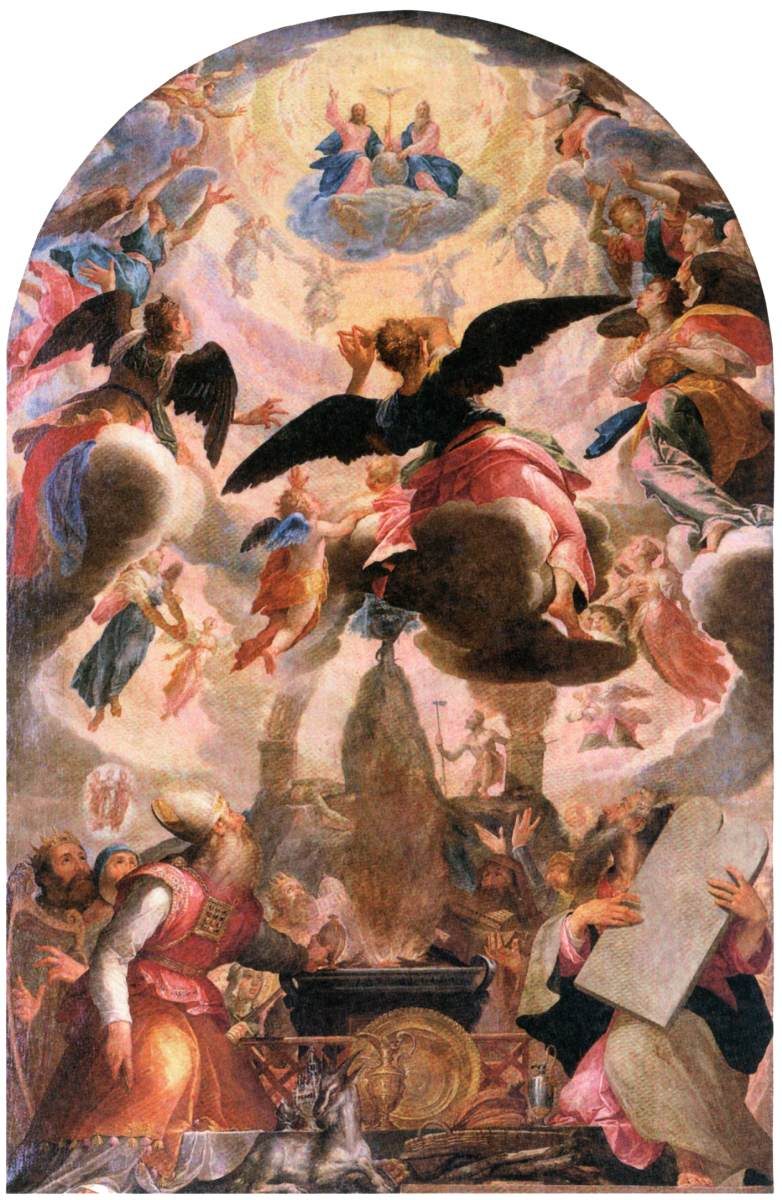
Offering of the Old Testament

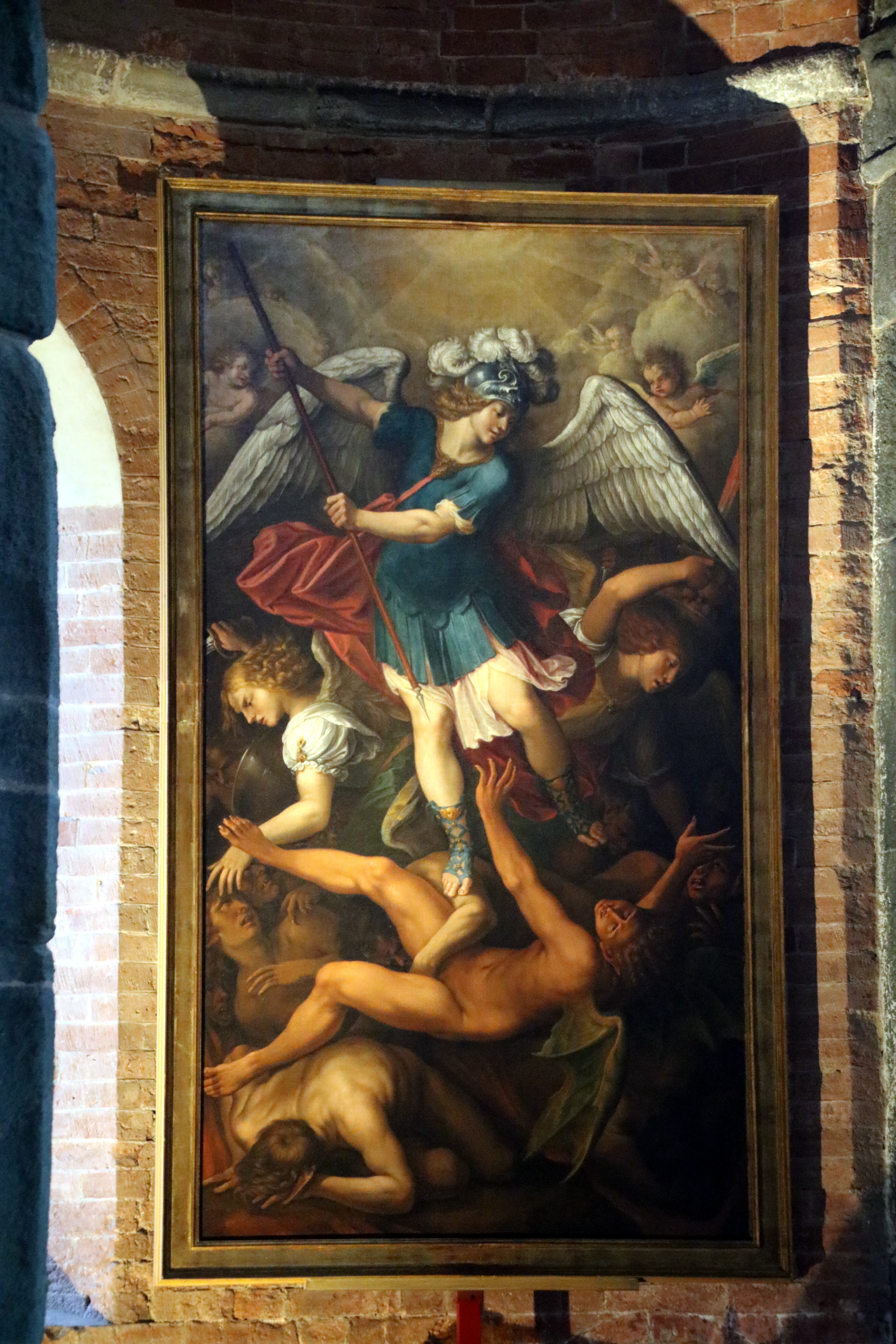
Archangel Michael Defeats the Devil, Sacra di San Michele
