= Girolamo Bonsignori =

Italian artist

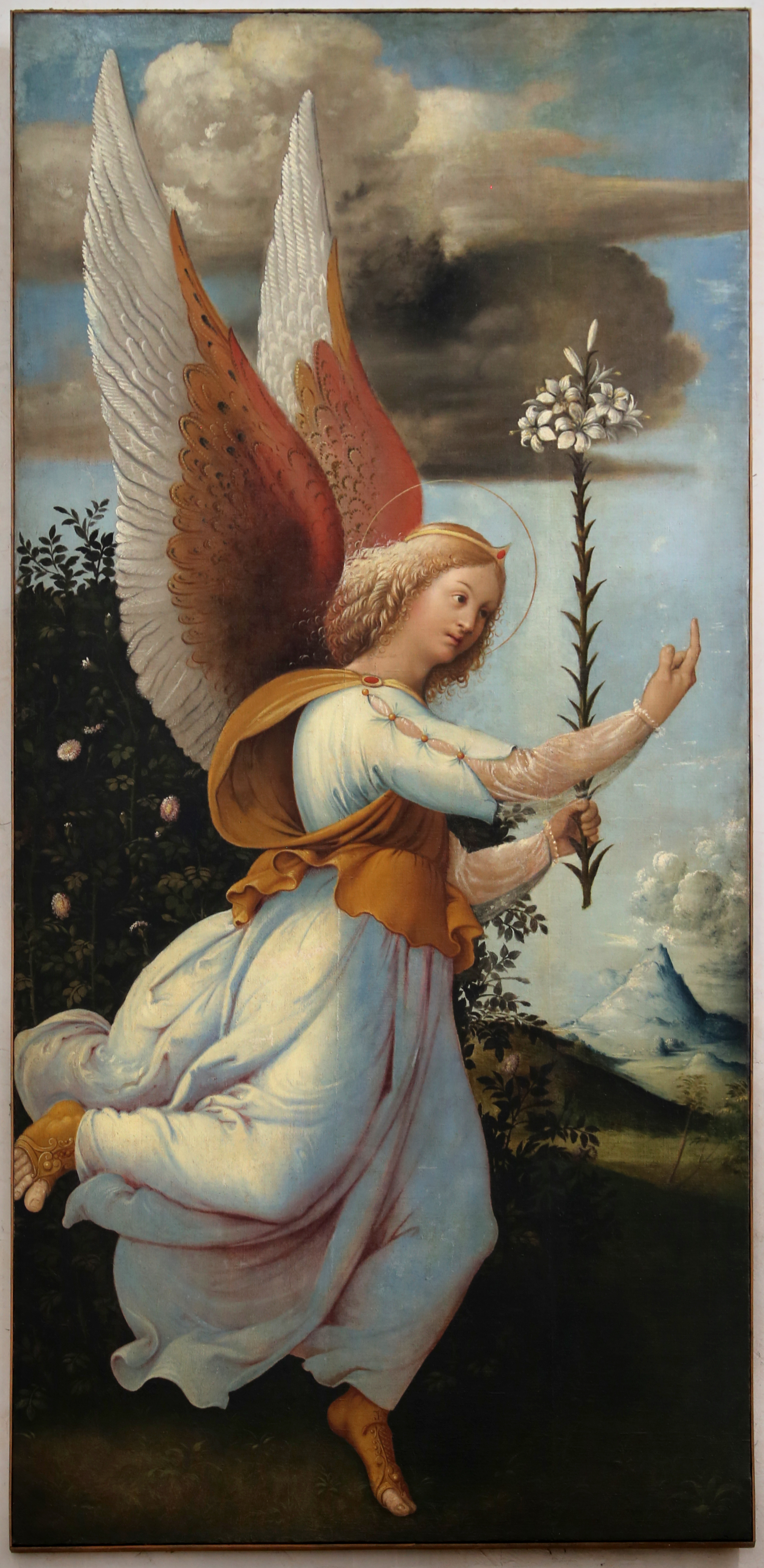
Annunciation, San Francesco al Corso, Verona

Fra Girolamo Bonsignori, (miscalled Monsignori; 1472–1549) was an Italian artist.

== Life ==
The brother of Francesco Bonsignori, he was born at Verona. At an early period in his life he became a monk of the order of the Dominicans, and in the church of his monastery he executed some altar-pieces. He at first studied the works of Mantegna, but in his later productions he followed the style of Fiesole. He produced some excellent copies of some of the paintings of Leonardo da Vinci, notably, one of the Last Supper, pronounced by Lanzi the best copy ever made of it. It was originally in the library of San Benedetto at Mantua. At the end of the 17th century on in the early 18th century it was bought by Count d'Espagnac and led to the Abbey of Santa Maria della Vangadizza in Badia Polesine, Veneto, where it remained until 1982 when the last heir of the D'Espagnac, Michel de Rostolan, sold it to the town of Badia Polesine, now restored and in excellent condition is preserved in the museum civic Barufaldi, Badia Polesine.

In the style of Leonardo he also painted a St. John, which is now in the Zecca at Milan. Among his early paintings there is, besides the altar-piece, a Last Supper in the Dominican monastery, and a Madonna in fresco in Santa Anastasia at Verona. He died of the plague at Mantua. Another brother of Francesco, Fra Cherubino Bonsignori, excelled in miniature painting.
