= Francesco Bonsignori =

Italian painter (c.1455–1519)

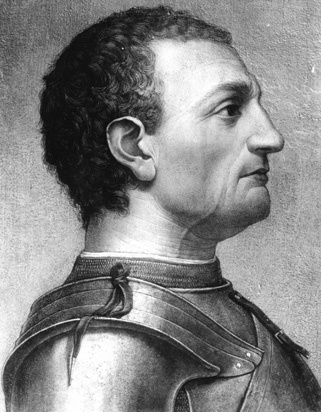
Portrait of Francesco Bonsignori by an unknown artist, Rijksmuseum, Netherlands

Francesco Bonsignori (c. 1455 – July 2, 1519), also known as Francesco Monsignori, was an Italian painter and draughtsman, characterized by his excellence in religious subjects, portraits, architectural perspective and animals. He was born in Verona and died in Caldiero, a city near Verona. Bonsignori's style in early period was under the influence of his teacher Liberale da Verona. After becoming the portraitist and court artist to the Gonzaga family of Mantua in 1487, his style was influenced by Andrea Mantegna, who also worked for Francesco Gonzaga from the 1480s. They collaborated to execute several religious paintings, mainly with the theme of Madonna and Child. The attribution of the portrait of a Venetian Senator (National Gallery, London) was debatable until the last century because of the similarity in techniques used by Bonsignori and his teacher Mantegna. During the phase of his career in Mantua, there is an undocumented period between 1495 and July 1506 with no official record regarding his activities by the court of Mantua. Bonsignori's late style was decisively influenced by Lorenzo Costa in terms of form and color. He produced his last monumental altarpiece the Adoration of the Blessed Osanna Andreasi (Pal.Ducale, Mantua) in 1519 shortly before his death.

== Family ==
Francesco Bonsignori was born in Verona in 1455, the eldest among three sons in the Bonsignori family. His father Albertus Bonsignori was a well-known amateur painter. In childhood, Francesco was the most artistically talented of the Bonsignori children. His brothers, Bernardino (c.1476–1529) and Girolamo (c.1479 – unknown) also became painters. His younger brother Girolamo was highly appraised for his fine copy of Leonardo da Vinci’s Last Supper.

== Apprenticeships and early career ==
=== Apprenticeship under Liberale da Verona ===
Bonsignori was the pupil and apprentice of Liberale da Verona (1451–1536). Liberale da Verona was at first a miniaturist, who developed a larger style based on a following of Mantegna's work. There are Venetian influences observed in the coloring and background of his paintings. Liberale da Verona has contributed to the spread of the Squarcione style to Siena, and played an important role in influencing some Sienese painters such as Girolamo da Cremona. His appreciation of Francesco Squarcione, founder of the Paduan school and teacher of Andrea Mantegna, subsequently influenced Bonsignori’s early style and taste. Liberale da Verona was well-known for painting frescoes and altarpieces. Although he was renowned for his inventiveness and verve, his later works expose a shortage of consistent innovation and originality compared to his earlier period.

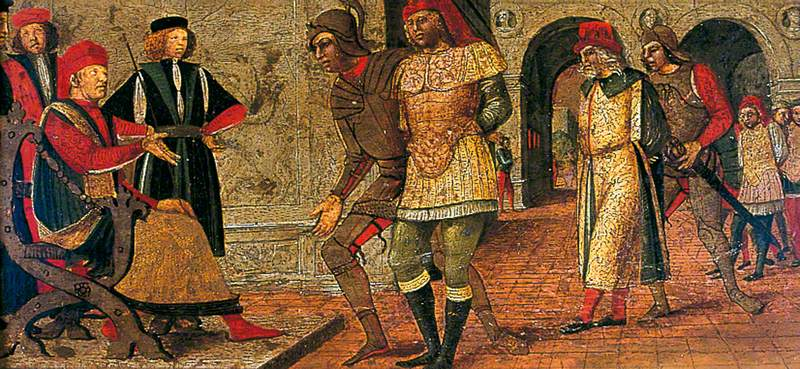
Bonsignori: Captive Kings before a Judge (1480), York Museums Trust

=== Early career ===
Bonsignori’s early career is the most fully documented period of his life. Account of his early life is found in Giorgio Vasari’s book Lives of the Painters, Sculptors and Architects. Vasari includes the painter in a group of minor virtuosi from Verona. Bonsignori bears another name, "Monsignori", as he was miscalled by Vasari in his book. His pseudonym has appeared in several documentations from the Renaissance period, while he signed all his committed artwork with “Bonsignori”. Fewer than a dozen drawings attributed to Bonsginori during his early career have survived. Most paintings mentioned in Vasari's account have perished.

He often integrated subtle elements observed in nature and daily life into religious paintings. In 1483, he produced his first signed work, Virgin and Child (Castelvecchio, Verona). The style of this work is similar to that of Madonna with Saints (Gemäldegalerie, Berlin), produced by his teacher Liberale de Verona. Influenced by his teacher, Bonsignori produced several altarpieces from 1484 to 1492. He completed the Virgin and Child Enthroned with Saints (Castelvecchio, Verona) in 1484.

During Bonsignori's early career, he was inspired and influenced by different artists, including his early models Giovanni Bellini, Alvise Vivari, Antonello da Messina, and Andrea Mantegna. Integration of styles from different contemporary masters is notable in Bonsignori's early pieces, which were characterized by his concentration on human figures in devotional picture and portraits. Landscape and architectural settings in the background are often less significant in his paintings. Although derivative, Bonsignori's early style was recognizably his own.

== Mantua period ==
Bonsignori's middle career period began after he moved to Mantua in 1487. The Portrait of a Venetian Senator (National Gallery, London) was signed and dated in 1487. Successively, he produced several altarpieces depicting The Virgin and Child Enthroned with Music-making Angels and SS George and Jerome (Banda Chapel, S Bernardino, Verona) in 1488. The Virgin and Child Enthroned with SS Anthony of Egypt and Onofrio, signed and dated in 1488, is known only through a 19th-century copy preserved in Florence. Accounts of Bonsignori's middle period are sourced from the official documents from the Gonzaga court in Mantua, but there is no official record of Bonsignori between 1495 and July 1506.

=== Bonsignori and the Gonzaga family ===
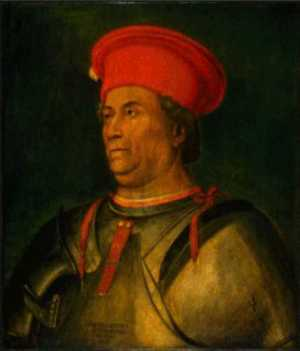
Bonsignori after Mantegna: Portrait of Francesco Sforza (circa 1490)

Francesco Bonsignori and his two brothers moved from Verona to Mantua in 1487. Francesco Bonsignori was employed by the Gonzaga family as a portrait painter and was in charge of decorations of their palace at Marmirolo and Gonzaga. Vasari reports that he lived at the court of Francesco Gonzaga, Marquis of Mantua, who provided him with a house for himself and his family. Bonsignori was also awarded a piece of land in the Gonzaga territory as reward for this service in 1494. Compliance with the wishes of Gonzaga family earned him both reputation and status as one of the most esteemed artist in Mantua. Due to the monopoly in the local artistic scene and prevalence of the Gonzaga family, Bonsignori's works produced while serving the Duke of Mantua are unified in terms of theme and content, focusing on portraits of the noble family and altarpieces. Francesco Gonzaga kept Bonsignori busy, as seen from the consecutive production of portraits by Bonsignori for Gonzaga family members. In 1494, Bonsignori was engaged to make a portrait of Francesco Gonzaga's daughter, one-year-old Eleonora Gonzaga (c. 1493–1550), who was later the Duchess of Urbino. In 1495, he produced a portrait of another Gonzaga child, the future Cardinal Ippolito. During the same year, Francesco Gonzaga commissioned a painting to display his military capability and leadership as the leader of Italian force and commemorate his victory against French king Charles Vlll in Fornovo on 6 July 1495. Two months after the war, Bonsignori travelled to Fornovo with Gonzaga's court architect Bernardino Ghisolfi (c. 1483–1511), so that he could accurately depict the physical contours of the battlefield in a large-scale fresco, which would be displayed in the family's country palace at Gonzaga, South of the Po River. Bonsignori's Triumph at Fornovo mural, currently lost, was eventually hung in the "Hall of the Victories", an audience room decorated with scenes of the Gonzaga family's most important military victories.

A chalk drawing of Francesco Gonzaga (National Gallery, Dublin) was executed and signed and dated in 1499. Because of its high quality, it has been attributed to Andrea Mantegna and Giovanni Bellini, both of whom are Bonsignori's early models. It is one of Bonsignori's most vigorous and sympathetic portrayals of a ruler, marking the affectionate and warm relationship between Bonsignori and his lifelong patron, friend, and admirer Francesco Gonzaga. In the same year, Bonsignori produced a portrait of Isabella d’ Este, 4th Marchesa of Mantua, which was delayed by her husband's commission. Isabella d' Este often sent portraits of herself as gifts to her female "courtiers". The exchange of portraits among ladies of the court of Mantua symbolized the acceptance into Marchesa's inner social circle and noble status. She referred to Bonsignori as "maestro (master)" in her letter exchanged between her and her lifelong friend Margherita Cantelma, Duchess of Sora, showing her satisfaction towards Bonsignori as her portrait painter.

In 1506, Bonsignori worked on the Last Supper for the monastery of Francesco de’ Zoccolanti in Mantua. The painting includes Federico Gonzaga, 5th Marquese of Mantua kneeling in front of his father Francesco. The chalk drawing of the Young Federico Gonzaga (Albertina, Vienna) is considered to be a preparatory study for this painting. Federico Gonzaga is depicted as being commended to Christ by St. Francis. On the opposite side, two Gonzaga family members, Cardinal Sigismondo Gonzaga (1469–1525) and Eleonora Gonzaga, are praised by St. Bernard. In the same year, another altarpiece, SS Louis and Francis with the insignia of Christ, preserved in the monastery of S Francesco de’ Zoccolanti in Mantua was executed. In 1509, Bonsignori created Portrait of Elisabetta Gonzaga (1471–1526; Uffiz, Florence), and that of Emilia Pia di Montefeltro (1470–1528) (MD Museum, Baltimore). Bonsignori produced countless portraits of the noble family in Mantua. Among the collection of portrait drawings, the majority belonged to the Gonzaga family for use as presents to foreign rulers in all Italian states and princes in France and Germany. Francesco Sforza, Massimiliano Sforza, (Duke of Milan) also commissioned their portraits. Bonsignori usually made monochrome record drawings of his portraits, a collection of which is preserved by his heirs in Verona. After Francesco Gonzaga died in March 1519, his son Federico Gonzaga supported him as his biggest and last patron until Bonsignori's death in July 1519. Among the Veronese painters who worked for the Gonzagas during the 15th century, Vasari highly praised Bonsignori for his talent in portraiture.

=== Bonsignori and Andrea Mantegna ===
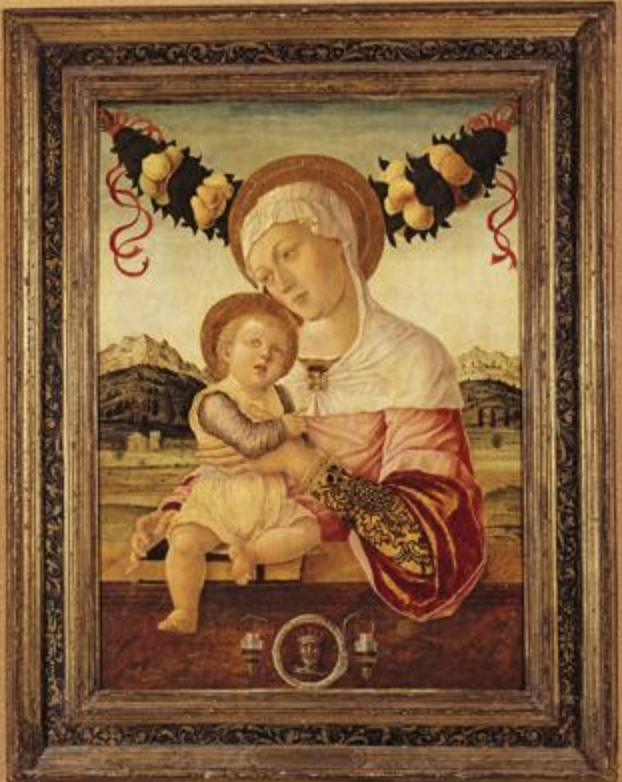
Mantegna and Bonsignori: Madonna and Child (1491), Philbrook Museum of Art, Tulsa, Oklahoma

Mantegna spent most of his life working for the Gonzaga family as court painter to the Gonzagas. Since he mainly focused on decorating their castles with frescoes in a small town in Mantua, he did not produce many paintings, but still devoted time to his workshop and traditional apprenticeship. Bonsignori was one of his few students in his workshop in Mantua.

Bonsignori was already a master with a modest reputation when he came to Mantua and joined Mantegna's workshop in 1490. Between 1491 and 1492, Bonsignori worked as Mantegna's assistant at Marmirolo, Mantua. They collaborated on several works during this period. In 1491, The Napoleon Madonna – Madonna and Child (Philbrook Museum of Art) was painted by Mantegna with Bonsignori's assistance. The provenance of this painting can be traced to the collection of the Palais Royal in Paris. It was sold by Prince Jerome Napoleon is 1872, and was exhibited in Burlington House in 1880 and 1894. Stylistic evidence suggests that Mantegna designed and outlined the composition, and painted the Child and the medallion on the parapet. The composition of the Napoleon Madonna is exactly the same as the Madonna and Child (Kaiser Friedrich Museum, Berlin) which Mantegna completed in his middle period. Mantegna then left the painting unfinished as he was busy with the decorations of Gonzaga palace in the 1490s. His assistant Bonsignori completed the painting. A similar collaboration can be observed in the Portrait of a Warrior in the Widener Collection (Lynnewood Hall, Philadelphia), where Bonsignori executed the portrait while Mantegna designed and painted in his studio. During his apprenticeship under Mantegna, Bonsignori also painted the Head of a Female Saint (Poldi-Pezzoli Museum, Milan), the Portrait of Youth (Metropolitan museum, New York) and the Madonna with four Saints (1490–1510, The National Gallery, London). The facial expressions in the pictures are notably similar to that of the Napoleon Madonna, which signifies the influence of Mantegna on his style. Certain morphological details such as the nose, mouth, and eyes are painted identically in terms of modelling and shape. Less learned and correct in his design than Mantegna, Bonsignori is more modern in his style and his coloring has more morbidezza. He excelled in painting animals, which he was fond of introducing in the background of his compositions. His paintings portraying animals were alleged to deceive dogs and birds, and he was termed "the modern Zeuxis" (after an ancient Greek animal painter). One of his pictures representing Saint Louis is preserved in the Brera at Milan. There are some perspective views in the refectory of the church of the Franciscans at Mantua, demonstrating that he was a master of that branch of art.

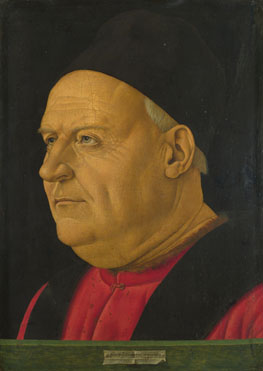
Bonsignori: Portrait of an Elderly Man (1487), also known as Portrait of a Venetian Senator, National Gallery, London

=== Portrait of an Elderly Man ===
Because Mantegna's Mantuan portraits significantly influenced Bonsignori's style, the attribution of the Portrait of an Elderly Man (National Gallery, London), produced by Bonsignori during his middle period, confused modern art historians until the 19th century. In the mid-19th century, the portrait was purchased by the Venetian collector Cesare Bernasconi. The subject of the painting was first identified by Bernasconi as Giovanni Cappello, a member of the ancient patrician Cappello family of Venice. His identity was further confirmed by 17th-century family genealogy, as a senator and procurator of San Marco from 1466. Therefore, this painting also bears another name, The portrait of Venetian senator. The elderly man is depicted as a distinguished Venetian Patrician, wearing a black hat, stole and scarlet gown with fur around the neck. Bonsignori integrated innovative elements into a traditional portrait of a nobleman, otherwise typical of contemporary artists in Northern Italy. These elements include a green parapet in the foreground with an illusionistic cartellino and the dark neutral background. The Venetian senator does not directly gaze at the viewer, which creates a distant atmosphere that emphasizes a patrician's dignity and nobleness.

The attribution of a black chalk drawing (Albertina, Vienna) of the same subject has been debated for centuries. The vibrant facial expression, incisive depiction of the man's features, and skillful play on light caused art historians such as Philip Pouncey, David Ekserdjian and Konrad Oberhuber to suggest that the chalk drawing was created by Mantegna as a preparatory study for Bonsignori's use. The chalk drawing is more vibrant than the painting. In addition, distinctive techniques applied by Mantegna in his paintings, such as strong diagonal brushstrokes and the vigorous plasticity of figures are absent here. The execution of linear outlines, tepid evenness and tonal modeling rather suggest the style of Bonsignori. Contemporary sources reveal the steps followed by Bonsignori in his portraiture practice. Letters exchanged between Francesco Gonzaga, 4th Marquess of Mantua and his wife Isabella d’ Este, concerning the portrait of their son proved that the charcoal cartoon was part of Bonsignori's working method before transferring the design to a panel. They praised its high quality: “quello di carbone piu bello che mai vedesti” ("That one in charcoal more beautiful than any you have ever seen.") Vasari also mentioned in his book that Bonsignori habitually kept drawn copies of the paintings, likely to serve as models for new portraits. The carefully executed cartoon of an elderly man in the Albertina may be such a record drawing of The Portrait of an Elderly Man.

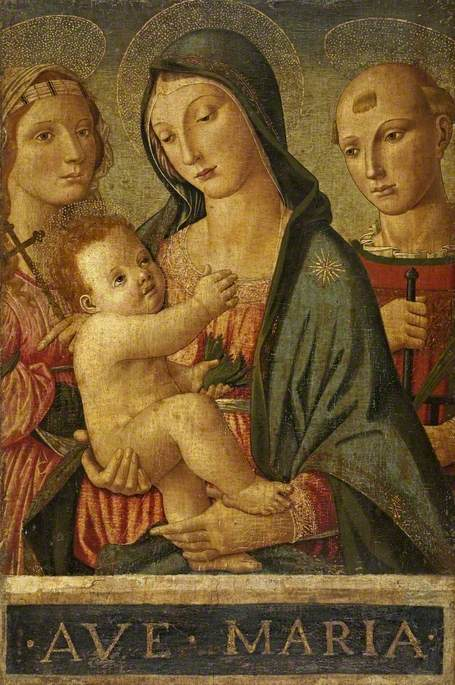
Bonsignori: Madonna and Child with Saints Lawrence and Margaret of Antioch (1483–1484), Russell-Cotes Art Gallery & Museum

=== Evolution of Madonna and Child ===
The early compositions of Madonna by Bonsignori are Virgin and Child (c.1483, Castelvecchio, Verona), followed by the dal Bovo Altarpiece, depicting the Virgin and Child Enthroned with Saints, (c.1484, Castelvecchio, Verona). They exemplify the earliest version of representing Madonna and Child, with typical characteristic of formation of arc behind the head of Madonna. The skills are immature, as Bonsignori is still not familiar with linear perspective. He fails to represent haloes and trees in three-dimensional form. The background is desolated and less significant, which is typical of Bonsignori's style in his early period. The painting is also geometrically symmetrical, which restricts the free expression of natural beauty. The modelling of the drapery on Onophrius, Jerome, Bishop Saint and Altobella Avogadro is plastic and hard. The facial expression of Madonna is gentle and warm, which differentiates Bonsignori from other painters in the 15th century, such as Andrea Mantegna, Giovanni Bellini and Alvise Vivari, who painted Madonna with solemnness and impassiveness.

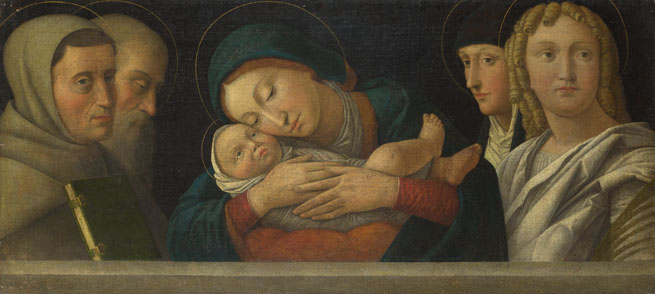
Bonsignori: The Virgin and Child with Four Saints (circa 1490 – circa 1510) The National Gallery, London

The Napoleon Madonna features the last step of evolution in Madonna paintings, as well as progression of Bonsignori's skills. The Madonna and child are sitting on the parapet, which suggests the influence of Mantegna's style. The Madonna and Child (Kaiser Friedrich Museum, Berlin) concentrates on human figures before a dark, neutral background featuring a garland of fruit. Contrarily, Napoleon Madonna gives an impression of freedom as there are abundant spaces on all four sides of the painting and landscape in the background. The treatment of drapery folds is much softer, indicating advancement in Bonsignori's skills during his middle period. The medallion on the parapet is added to balance the fruits and ribbon, adding symmetry. The Child is painted with coquettish attitude rather than a Mantegnesque distant and severe facial expression typical of Bonsignori's middle period. This sense of freedom and elegance of this composition is typical of Bonsignori's style, and also signifies Mantegna's change of style in his late career.

The Virgin and Child with Four Saints (The National Gallery, London) is the best-known of his works featuring Madonna and Child. It was painted between 1490 and 1510, during his undocumented period in Mantua. The saint on the left who is holding a book is Franciscan, while other three saints are not identifiable. According to Vasari, the appearance and position of the group of saints and child are derived from an engraving by Mantegna in reverse, except for the hand gestures of Madonna which is originally created by Bonsignori.

== Late period and maturation of style (1507-1519) ==
After Andrea Mantegna's death in September 1506, controversy about who would succeed Mantegna as court painter to the Gonzagas arose. Bonsignori, despite being Mantegna's favorite pupil and supported by the Gonzaga family in Matua, was not selected by the Mantuan court to be their court painter. According to Vasari, Bonsignori failed to express his passion and reverence towards antiquity, which was popular among the artists in Mantua as one of the artistic requirements. In addition, Isabella d’ Este, the Marchesa of Mantua, did not appreciate his art. Following Mantegna, Lorenzo Costa the elder succeeded as the court painter of Mantua in 1507. He had a significant impact on Bonsignori's late period style in terms of mood and color. The altarpiece Christ Carrying the Cross (Pal. Ducale, Mantua) created by Bonsignori in 1510 shows the influence of Costa. Use of form and color in St. Sebastian (S Maria delle Grazie, Curtatone) and the Virgin and Child in Glory with SS Blaise, Sebastian, Martial and Juliana (SS Nazaro e Velso, Verona) produced between 1510 and 1519 can be identified as typical of Costa's style. Bonsignori completed his final major work the Adoration of the Blessed Osanna Andreasi (Pal. Ducale, Mantua) in 1519, shortly before his death.

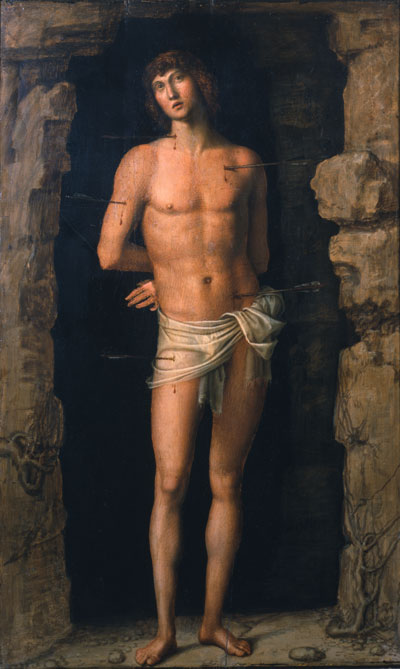
Bonsignori: Saint Sebastiano (circa 1510 – circa 1519), Museo Statale d'Arte, Arezzo

=== Pangs of St. Sebastian ===
St. Sebastian was locally favored in Mantua in the 16th century. Before Francesco Bonsignori produced St Sebastian (S Maria delle Grazie, Curtatone), his teacher Andrea Mantegna produced three paintings of the subject, commissioned by the Gonzaga family. Bonsignori's ideas were often inspired from life and he conscientiously observed and copied items from nature. As a preparation for St Sebastian (S Maria delle Grazie, Curtatone), he spent four years on observation and execution to achieve naturalistic effects. Vasari mentioned in his book that Bonsignori used a sturdy porter as his model for the natural effect, suggested by his patron Francesco Gonzaga, the 4th Marquess of Mantua. Only a few of the artists who treated the theme of St. Sebastian actually used real men as their models for their images of the vulnerable saint. By modelling the saint on some fine figure of man, Bonsignori carefully examined the movement of muscle and transfer of weight. There is an anecdote regarding the creation of this work mentioned in Vasari's book. When Francesco Gonzaga first visited Bonsignori's studio, he complained that the bindings of St. Sebastian were minimal and there was no sign of frenzy to loosen them. Additionally, the saint did not show sense of panic expected in a man bound up and shot at with arrows. The figure lacked the power and expression of emotion to transfix the viewer. The next day, Bonsignori sought for a more convincing demonstration of St. Sebastian by trussing up his model. However, he soon sent a secret message to Gonzaga, confessing his failure to understand his will. Gonzaga burst into his studio in the afternoon, furiously waving a crossbow to the porter, yelling "Traitor! You’re a dead!” Terrified by his attack, the porter manically tried to break the ropes to escape. The fear in the wretched porter's facial expression and physical frenzy ideally replicated the physical and psychological struggle St. Sebastian would experience when he was about to be mortally pierced with arrows. "There! Now you have him as he should be! I leave the rest to you." Then the Marquess turned to Bonsignori. Inspired by Gonzaga, Bonsignori recomposed his painting more realistically and naturalistically. Few artists showed the actual end of St Sebastian. St Sebastian (S Maria delle Grazie, Curtatone) was eventually placed in the Mantuan church of the Madonna delle Grazie.

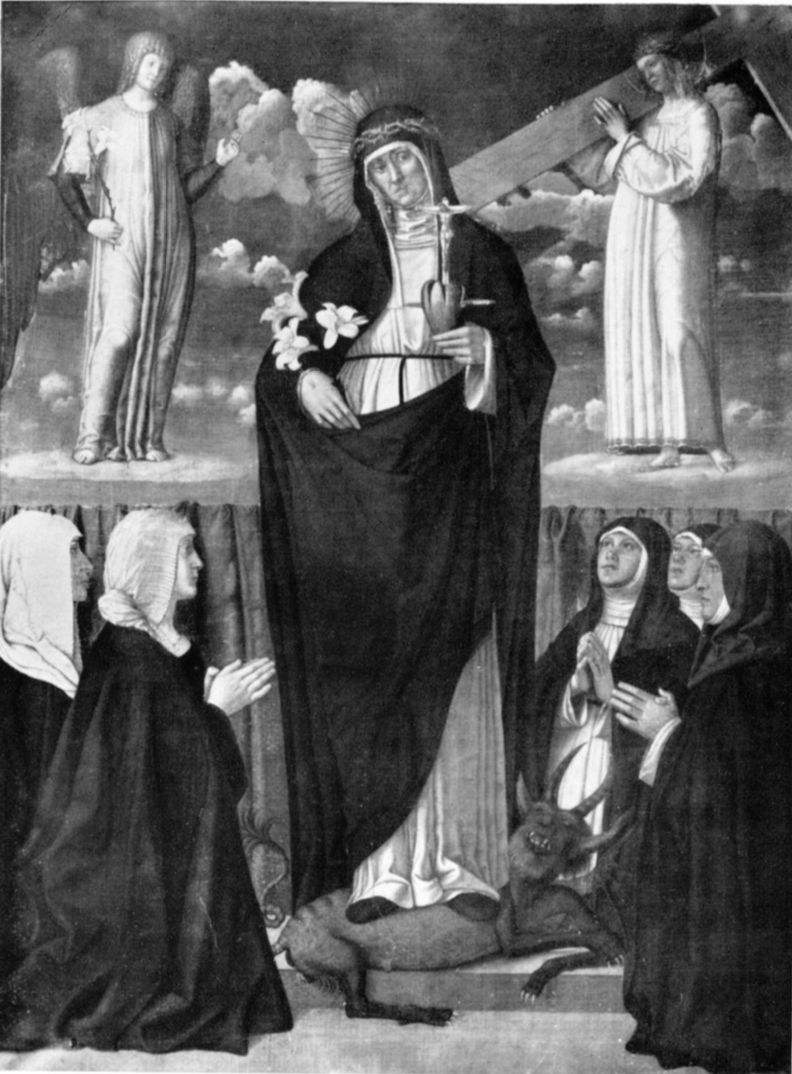
Bonsignori: The Adoration of the Blessed Osanna Andreasi (1519), Pal. Ducale, Mantua

=== The Blessed Osanna ===
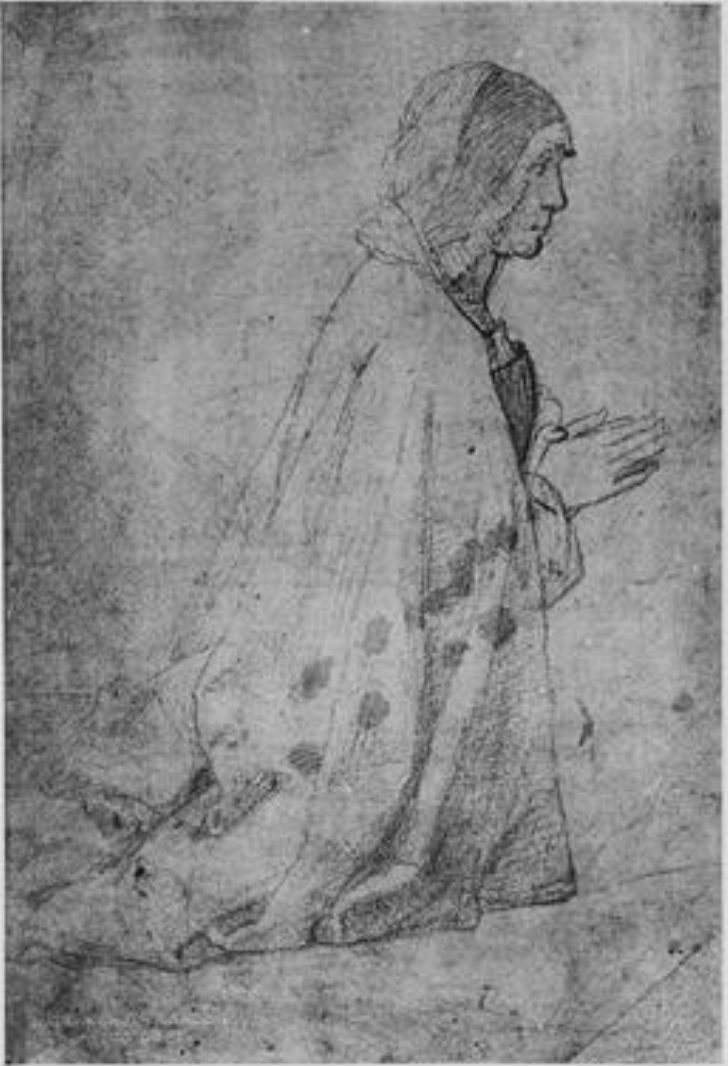
Bonsignori: Isabella d' Este (1519), chalk drawing, National Gallery, London

Unlike the Madonna and Child with Four saints (National Gallery, London), Bonsignori is no longer overawed by Mantegna. The Adoration of the Blessed Osanna Andreasi (Pal. Ducale, Mantua) depicts The Blessed Osanna (1449–1505) as a highly esteemed nun, surrounded by three Dominican nuns and two women, including Isabella d’ Este, 4th Marchesa of Mantua in a secular dress, who is kneeling in the left foreground. According to the chalk portrait of donatrix Bonsignori made for this altarpiece (British Museum, London), Bonsignori first drew Isabella d’ Este dressed as a widow, indicating the painting was executed after the death of her husband Francesco Gonzaga on 29 March 1519. The chalk drawing is a preparatory drawing used for the resultant painted piece. The identical details of pose and costume in both drawings prove that they were created by the same artist. The painting depicts her as a younger and prettier woman, with no trace of double-chin as in the chalk drawing. She holds herself upright, showing her elegance and pride as a noble woman. The spontaneity, fluency of lines and the presence of pentimento in her neck and face substantiate that the altarpiece is Bonsignori's original study. The Brief Sanctioning her cult in the province of Mantua was only issued on 20 January 1515. The rays of beatification emanating from the Beata's head implies that the drawing has been executed at least 10 years after her death in 1505. Even though there is a great veneration paid to the Beata from the people before and after her death, this altarpiece is unlikely to be commissioned earlier. Bonsignori focused on the facial expression and gestures of figures, rather than architectural element and natural landscape with narrative details in the background. The detailed depiction of Osanna's facial features shows us the familiarity Bonsignori had about the figure, who was a venerated spiritual and political advisor of the Gonzaga family for decades. She was also well known for her posthumous intervention in curing Isabella d’ Este's chronic headache in 1507. Her remains were transferred to S. Domenica in the presence of Francesco Gonzaga, showing her close connection with the Gonzaga family. The composition style of this devotional painting is as old-fashioned as Bonsignori's first altar-piece in 1484. Bonsignori died during the cure at Caldiero near Verona four months later. In his last monumental work, Bonsignori achieved a combination of the devotional picture and portrait, which are the genres he dedicated to for his entire career.

The Veneration of the Blessed Osanna Andreasi (Pal. Ducale, Mantua) is a work of devotion. Bonsignori tied together elements of mystics, matrons, and monastics, which combined to create a complex pattern. This illustrates the relationship between the holy and the secular, the public and the private devotion. Viewers are compelled to think about the rich and complicated female religious life in sixteenth-century Mantua that the painting aims to show in full. The art is beyond that of a venerated local saint, but an illustrative document of intricate female relationships organized around a body of that saint. The altarpiece can be described as a "city of women". In it are lifelong friends bounded by mutual devotion, private worries and popular piety, a mother and daughter, and a daughter with her monastic sisters. Today, the civic museum that occupies the former Gonzaga palace of San Sebastiano houses the painting, yet it was once found in the female Dominican monastery of San Vincenzo. Like so many monasteries of the early period, the monastery was suppressed and later fell into disrepair during the Napoleonic era. Mantua, not unlike most Italian cities, has a modern fabric that is constructed on top of the armature of the medieval and Renaissance city. Some of the female monasteries that made up the city at the time the altarpiece was produced are still surviving until this date as more practical venues like schools or cultural centers. Yet, many others did not withstand the test of time.

== Major works ==
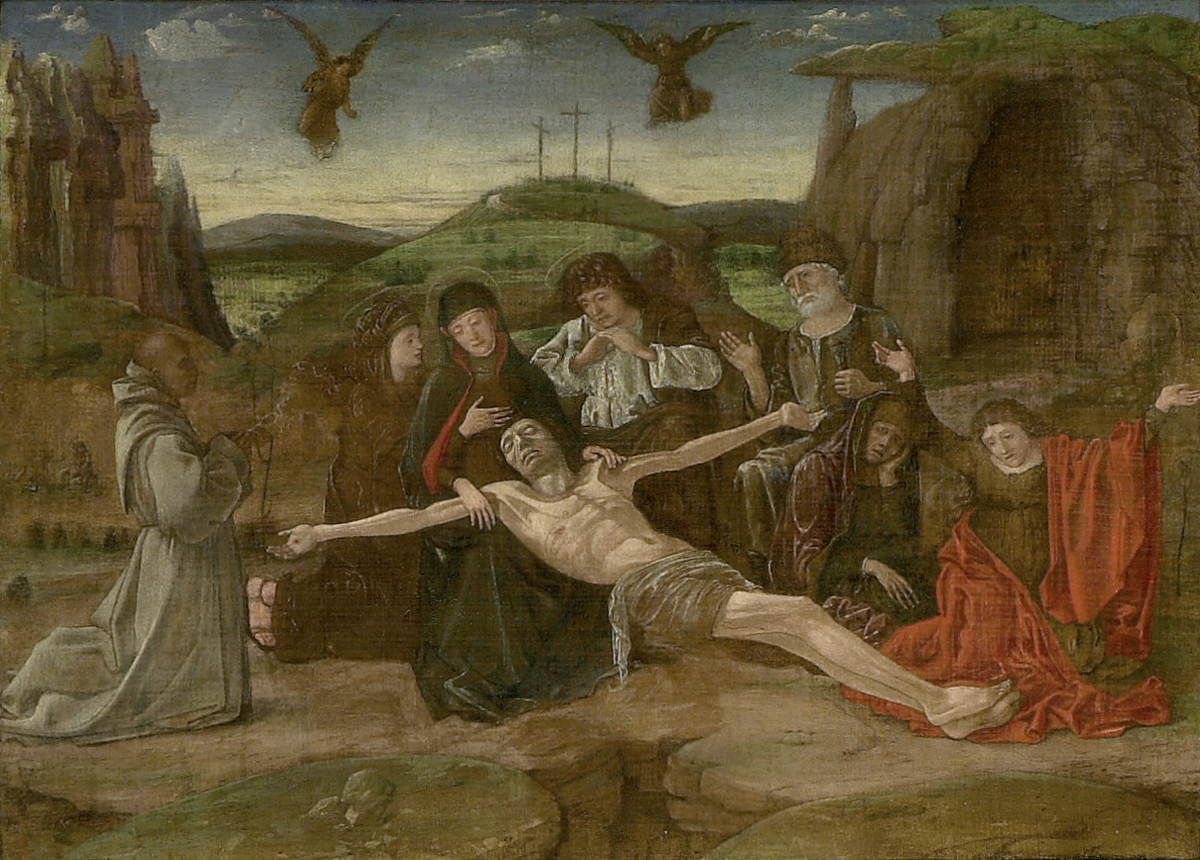
Bonsignori: The Lamentation with a Benedictine Donor. The Ashmolean Museum of Art and Archaeology. (Circa 1490)

Profile of warrior - Walters Art Gallery, Baltimore

Christ bearing Cross, and Saint Veronica - Bargello Carrand Collection, Florence

Furniture panel: Apollo and Daphne - Berenson Collection, Florence

The lamentation with a Benedictine Donor - The Ashmolean Museum of Art and Archaeology, Oxford

Portrait of an elderly man - 1487, The National Gallery, London

Way to Golgotha.L. Visions of Blessed Osanna Andeasi, with Isabella d’Este - Palazzo Ducale, Mantua

Bust of elderly man - J.G. Johnson Collection, Philadelphia

Bust of youthful Savior - J.G. Johnson Collection, Philadelphia

Madonna and sleeping Child - 1483, Verona

Madonna and Child enthroned with SS. Onophrius, Jerome, Christopher, Bishop Saint and Altobella Avigadro, widow of Donato Dal Bovo - 1484, Museo di Castelvecchio, Verona

Two Angels holding curtain - S. Anastasia, over sacristy door, Verona

Madonna and Child enthroned with SS. Jerome and George - 1488, S. Bernardino, Cappella Dei Banda, Verona

Madonna and Child in Glory and SS. Blaise, Sebastian and Juliana - 1514–19, SS. Nazaro E Celso, Verona

Madonna and Child with SS. Anthony Abbot and Mary Magdalen - S. Paolo, First chapel R, Verona

Crucifixion - S. Lorenzo, fourth altar, R. transept, Vicenza

Predella: Two captive kings before a judge – York

Bust of Petrus Leonius – Homeless

Madonna and Child - 1491, The Samuel H. Kress Collection, Philbrook Museum of Art, Tulsa, OK

Head of female saint - Poldi-Pezzoli museum, Milan
