= Giovanni Canti (painter) =

Italian painter

Giovanni Canti (ca. 1650–1716) was an Italian painter of the Baroque. Born in Parma. Active in early 18th century. Among his pupils were Giuseppe Bazzani and Francesco Maria Raineri. He resided chiefly at Mantua, where he painted mainly battle-pieces and landscapes.

He painted an altarpiece depicting Madonna and Child and Saints for the church of Santa Maria della Carità in Mantua.
