= Giuseppe Bazzani =

Italian painter (1690–1769)

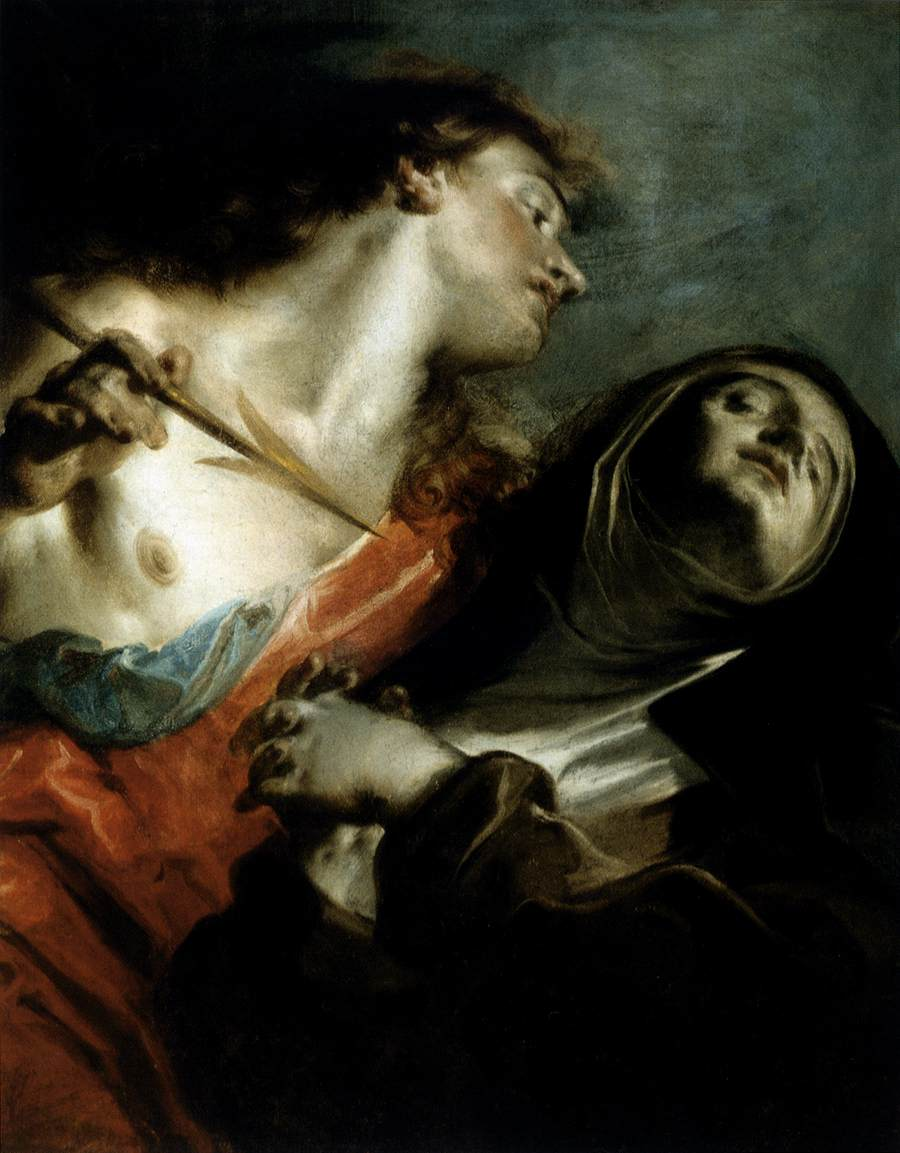
- Ectasy of St Theresa
- Born: September 23, 1690; Mantua
- Died: August 17, 1769 (aged 78); Mantua
- Education: Giovanni Canti
- Known for: Painting
- Movement: Baroque
- Patrons: Giacomo Biondi

Giuseppe Bazzani (23 September 1690 – 17 August 1769) was an Italian painter of the Rococo.

== Biography ==
Born in Mantua, Duchy of Mantua to a goldsmith, Giovanni Bazzani, early on he apprenticed with the Parmesan painter Giovanni Canti (1653–1715). A fellow pupil was Francesco Maria Raineri. He spent most of his life in Mantua. From 1752, he was faculty, and from 1767, director of the Accademia di Belle Arti of Mantua.

While ensconced in a declining provincial city, he absorbed international influences. His loose brushstrokes, fervid and often dark emotionalism, and tortured poses, which recall at times later expressionism, display stylistic tendencies more typical of Lombardy. Numerous artists, including Fetti, Bencovich, Rubens, and Magnasco are said to have influenced him, although the number and diversity of the artists suggested hints that he had an idiosyncratic and unique synthesis for his time.

Among his early works are paintings of the Miracles of Pius V, the Conversion of a Heretic and the Healing of a Madwoman (all mid-1720s; Mantua, Museum of the Ducal Palace of Mantua), initially painted for the church of Saint Maurice in Mantua. He painted depictions of the evangelists St. John, St. Mark and St. Luke (all late 1720s) for the parish church of Vasto di Goito. He painted the Baptism, the Ecstasy of St. Aloysius Gonzaga and the Ecstasy of Saints Francis & Anthony (1732) for the parish church of Borgoforte. Seven canvases depicting the Life of Alexander the Great were painted for Giacomo Biondi, one of the artist's early patrons. His altarpiece of St Romuald's Vision, initially painted for the church of San Marco, but now in Diocesan Museum of Mantua, the saint, book in hand, has a dream in which he sees his fellow Benedictine monks ascending to heaven in a clumsy, touching, human parade up a staircase instead of a mystical Jacob's ladder. The painting merges a mixture of mystical vision and stylized empiric observation. The nineteenth-century art historian Carlo D'Arco was unconvinced about this brash new style, and said of Bazzani's work that "(he) wanted always to always use a great force of genius ...and most of his works appear as if unperfected sketches and immature conceptions that are drowning and convulsing in mannered styles."

The painter Domenico Conti Bazzani (1740–1815) was his pupil and adopted son, and became a prominent Neoclassical painter in Rome.

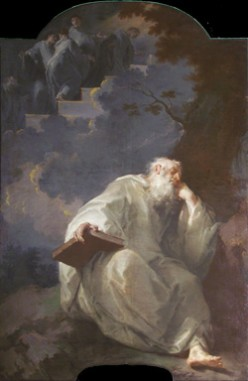
St Romuald's Vision

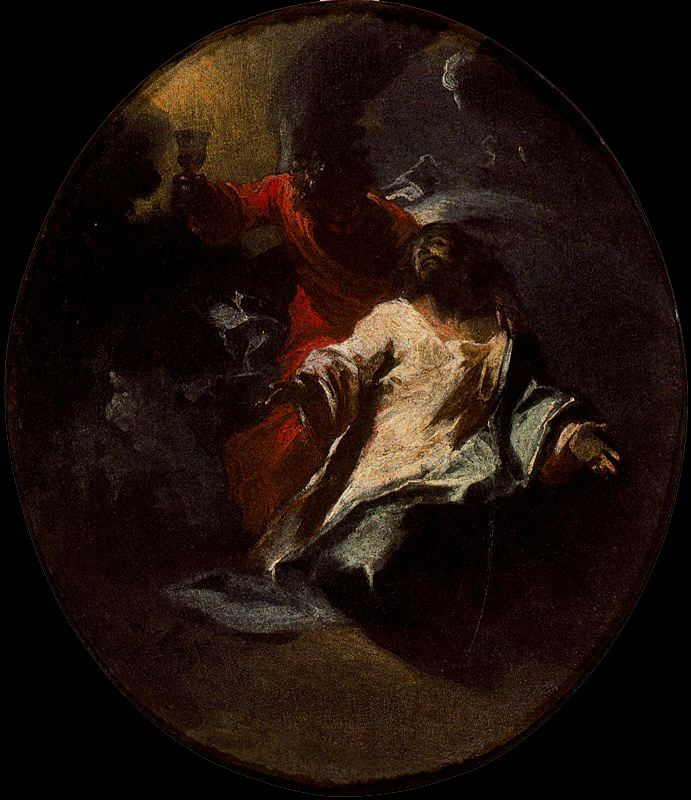
Agony in the Garden

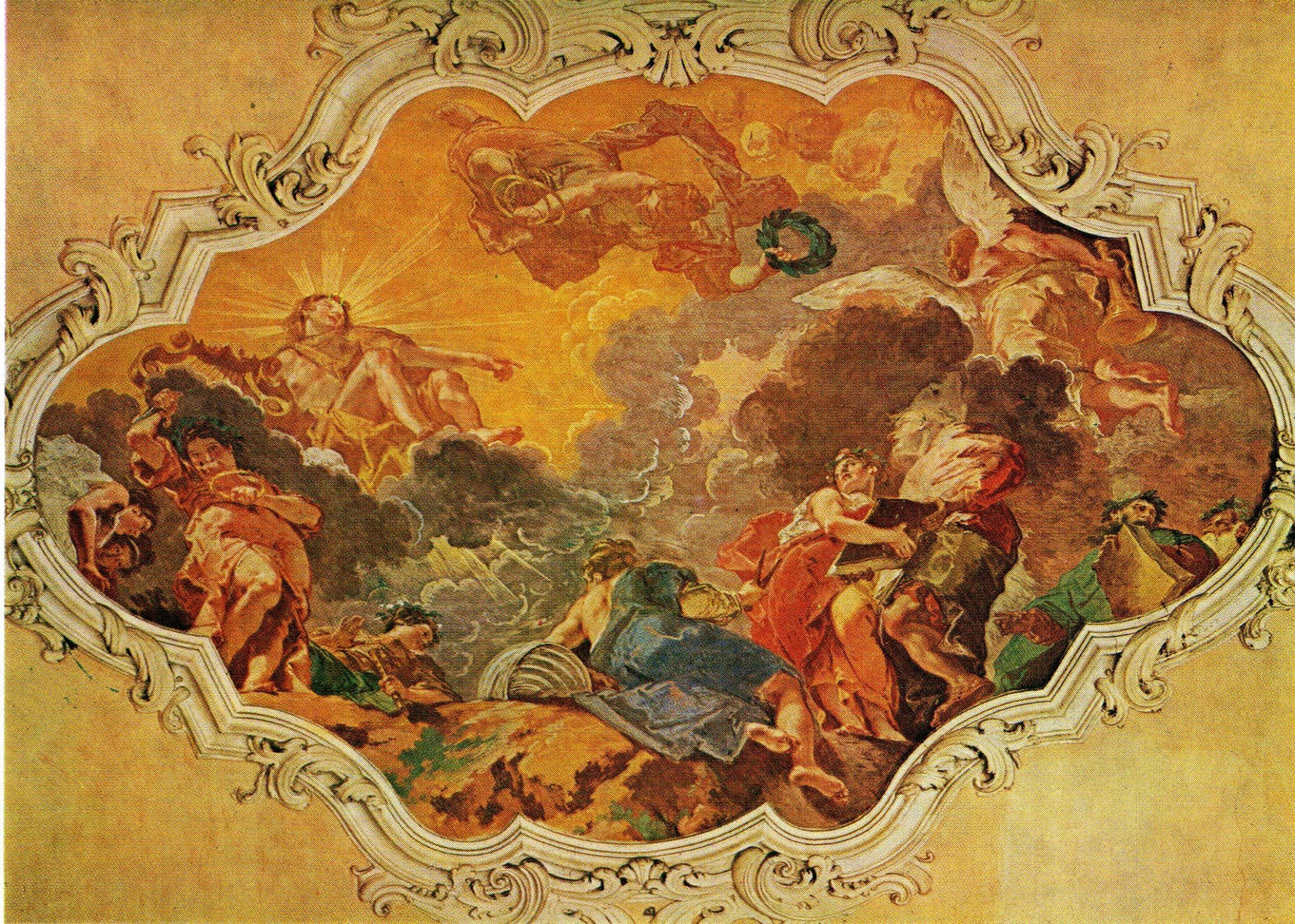
Apollo and the Muse, Palazzo Cavriani

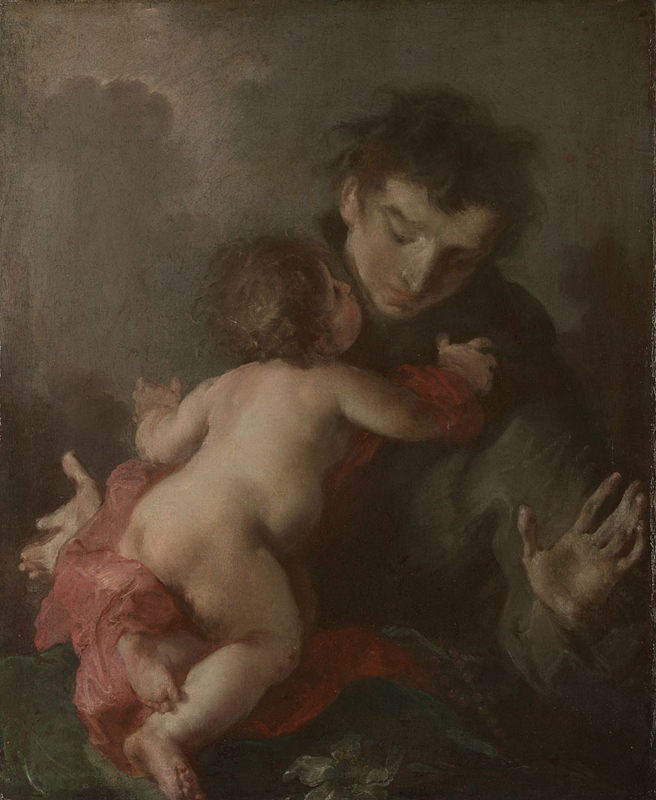
St Antony of Padua and Child

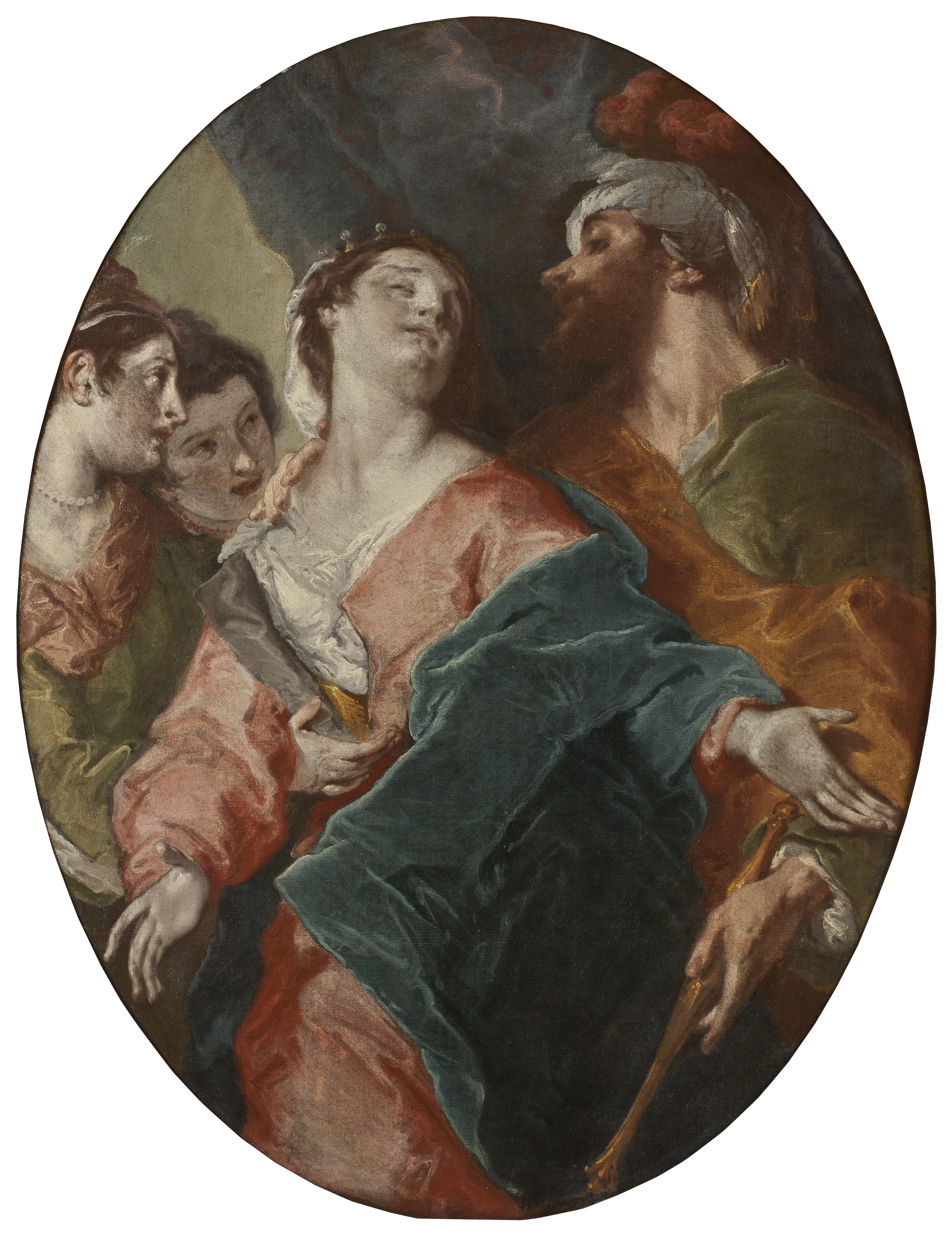
Esther and Ahaseurus

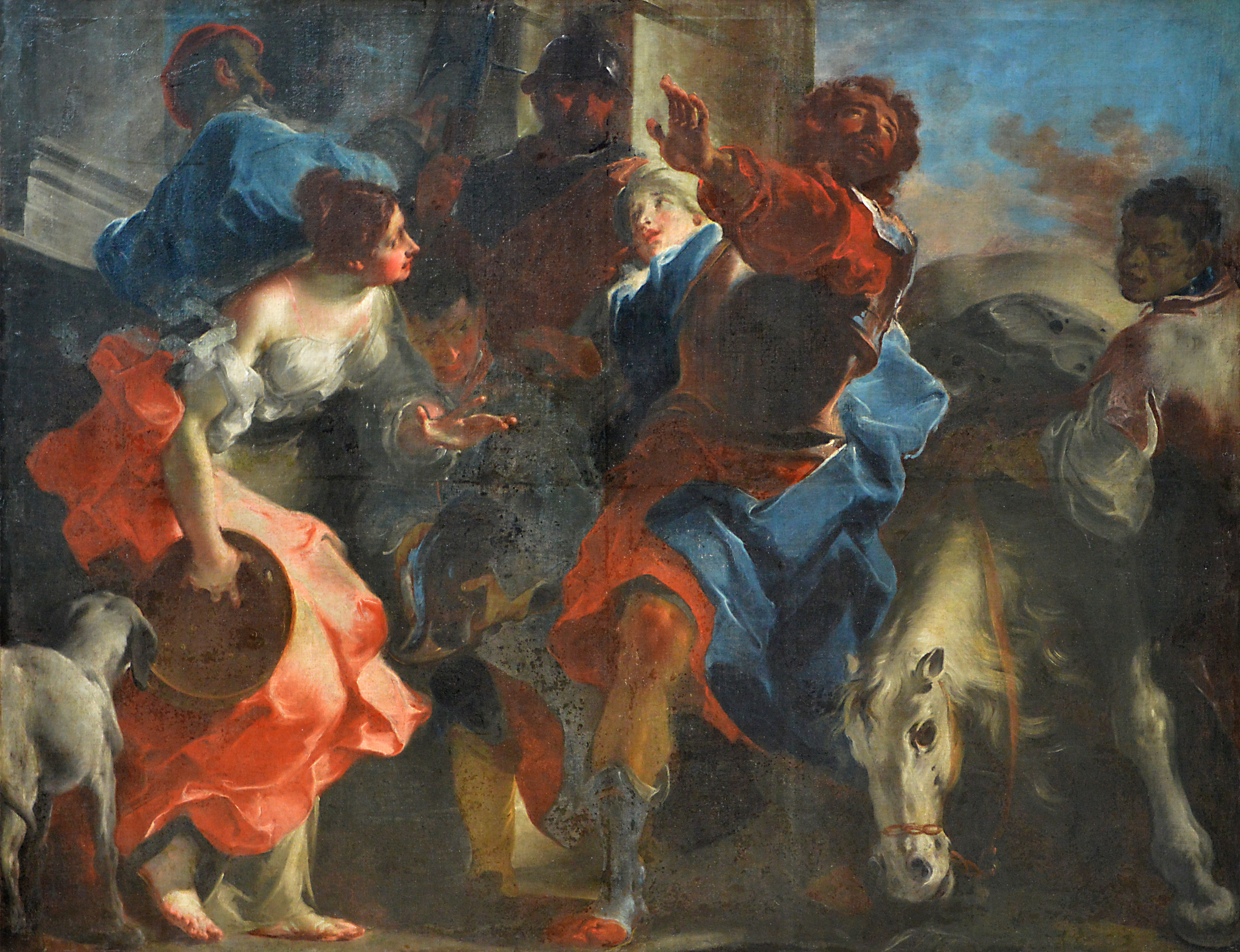
Daughter of Jephthah Louvre

== Anthology ==
Label	Work	Date	Site	Link
a.	Via Crucis		San Barnaba, Mantua	
b.	Via Crucis		Parish church, Cavriana	
c.	History of Alexander the Great	c. 1740	Palazzo d'Arco, Mantua	
d.	Baptism of Christ	c. 1732	Parish church, Borgoforte	
e.	Ecstasy of Saint Aloysius Gonzaga	c. 1729	Parish church, Borgoforte	
f.	Baptism of Christ	c. 1737	San Giovanni del Dosso, Mantua	
g.	Delivery of the Keys to St. Peter	1739	Parish Church, Goito	
h.	Sermon of the Baptist	c. 1740	Parish church, Gazoldo degli Ippoliti	
i.	Doubting Thomas	c. 1742	Private collection	
j.	Madonna with St. Clare & Annunciation	1751-52	Parish church, Revere	
k.	Miracles of Pius V	1752	San Maurizio, Mantua	
l.	Ovals in private collections		Mantua and Bologna	
m.	Ovals of the Miracle of the Rosary		Originally, parish church of Cavriana	
n.	Canvases		Santa Maria della Carita, Mantua	
o.	Ovals for the ceiling of St. Barnaba	c. 1768	San Paolo, Mantua	
p.	St. Margaret of Cortona	1764	Prampolini-Tirelli collection	
q.	Saint Anthony of Padua with the Infant Christ	c. 1745	National Gallery, London	
r.	Pieta with the Magdalen	c. 1750	Cleveland Museum of Art, Ohio, USA	
s.	Incredulity of St. Thomas	1730	Tucson Museum of Art, Arizona, USA	
t.	Departure of Prodigal Son	1750	Nelson-Atkins Museum, Kansas City, USA	
u.	The Tribute Money		MacKenzie Art Gallery, Saskatchewan	
v.	The Tribute Money	1742	San Diego Museum of Art, California, USA	
w.	Rest in Flight to Egypt		Accademia, Venice	
x.	The Daughter of Jephthah		Louvre, Paris	
y.	The walk to Mount Calvary		Louvre, Paris	
z.	Deposition from the Cross			
aa.	Ecstasy of St Theresa	1745		
bb.	Agony of Christ in the Garden		Uffizi Gallery, Florence	
bb.	Santa Margarita da Cortona	1740	Galleria della Fondazione Banca Agricola Mantovana, Mantua	
cc.	St. Longinus, Sant'Andrea, Sant'Elena with the relice of the precious blood	1740	ibid	
