= Francesco Maria Raineri =

Italian painter

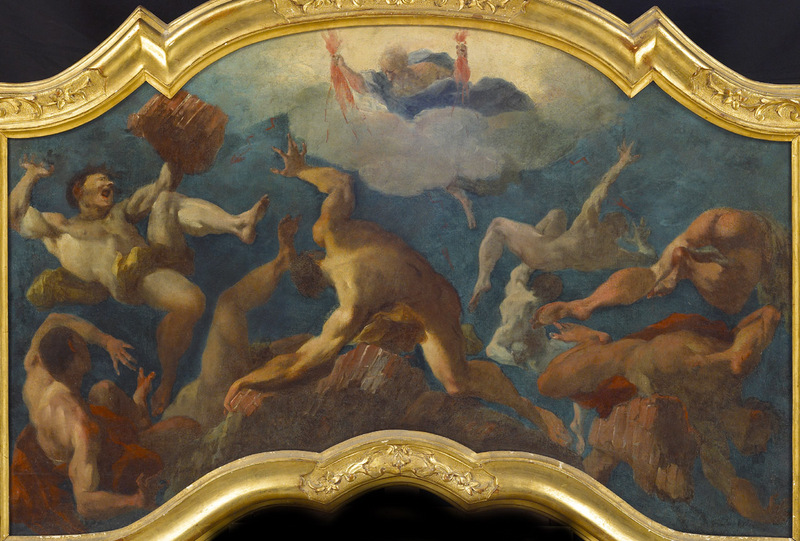
Francesco Maria Raineri, Fall of the Giants, private collection

Francesco Maria Raineri (2 February 1676 – 28 February 1758) was an Italian painter of the late-Baroque, mainly active in Mantua, Duchy of Mantua.

== Biography ==
Also called Lo Schivenoglia after the town, just outside the city of Mantua, of his birth. He was a pupil of Giovanni Canti. Among his works, he was known for his paintings of battle scenes, landscapes, and capriccios (vedute of imaginary scenes) with historical or mythologic figures. He was named director of the academy of painters in Mantua in 1752. He is known to have painted a St. Sebastian for the chapel of Santa Anna. He painted a San Francesco da Paola for the Oratorio della Beata Vergine della Misericordia, (also called della Disciplina) in Bozzolo.

He painted two altarpieces depicting Jesus among the Doctors and Jesus scatters the merchants from the Temple for the church of Santa Maria della Carità in Mantua.
