= Mantua Cathedral =

Cathedral of Saint Peter Apostole
- Cattedrale di San Pietro Apostolo
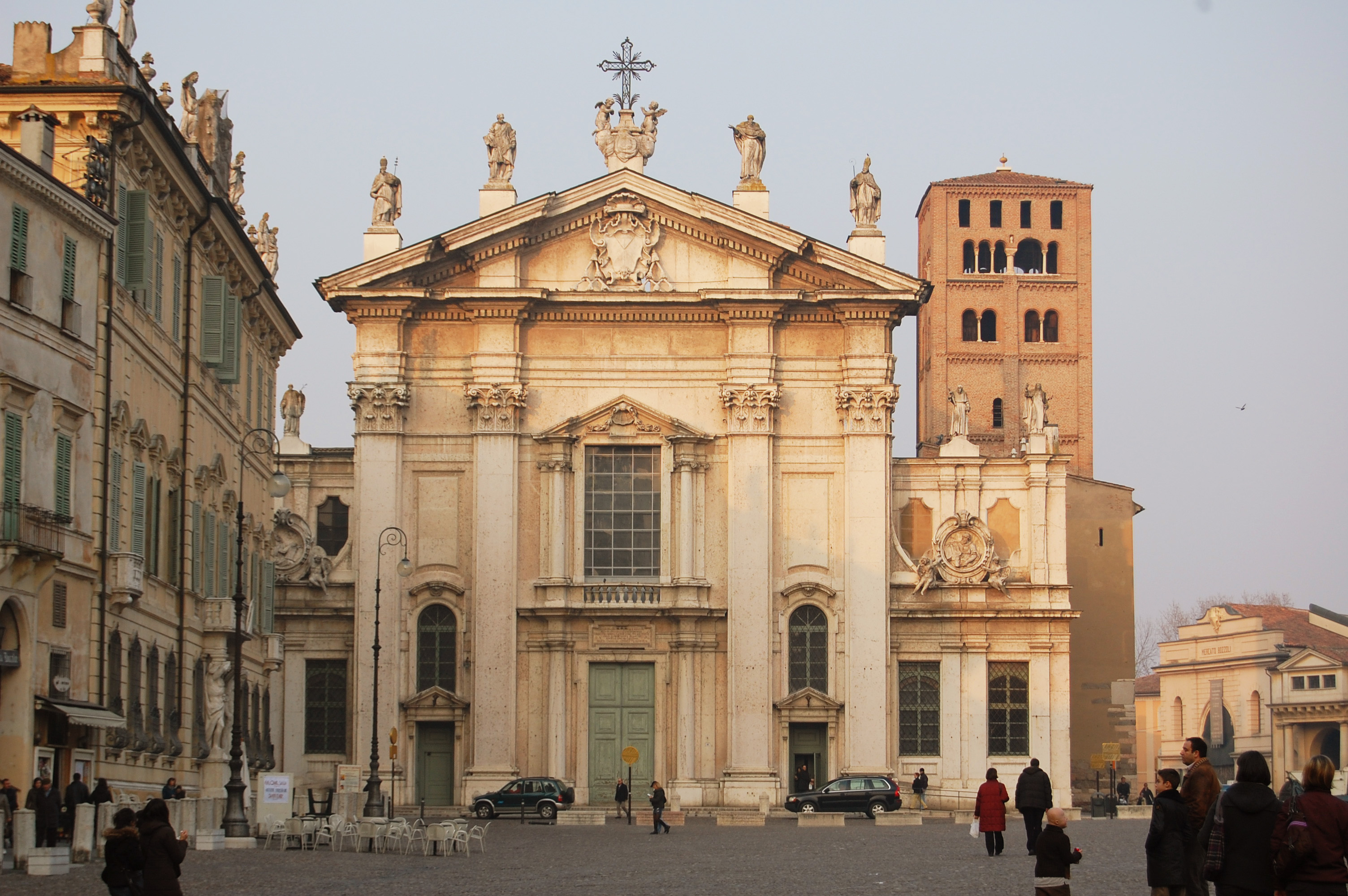
- Façade of the cathedral

- Location of Mantua Cathedral within Lombardy Cathedral of Saint Peter Apostole (Italy)
- 45°09′38″N 10°47′51″E
- Country: Italy
- Denomination: Roman Catholic

Administration
- Diocese: Mantua

Mantua Cathedral (Italian: Cattedrale di San Pietro apostolo; Duomo di Mantova) in Mantua, Lombardy, northern Italy, is a Roman Catholic cathedral dedicated to Saint Peter. It is the seat of the Bishop of Mantua.

== History ==
An initial structure probably existed on the site in the Early Christian era, which was followed by a building destroyed by a fire in 894. It was quickly re erected in Protoromanesque style. The church was rebuilt beginning in 1132 by Bishop Manfredo, initially in the Romanesque style. The bell tower was finished before 1150.

The current church stands on the Romanesque church of San Pietro, of which only some wall structures and the bell tower are preserved. It was rebuilt in 1395–1401 with the addition of side chapels and a Gothic west front, which can still be seen in a sketch by Domenico Morone (preserved in the Palazzo Ducale of Mantua).

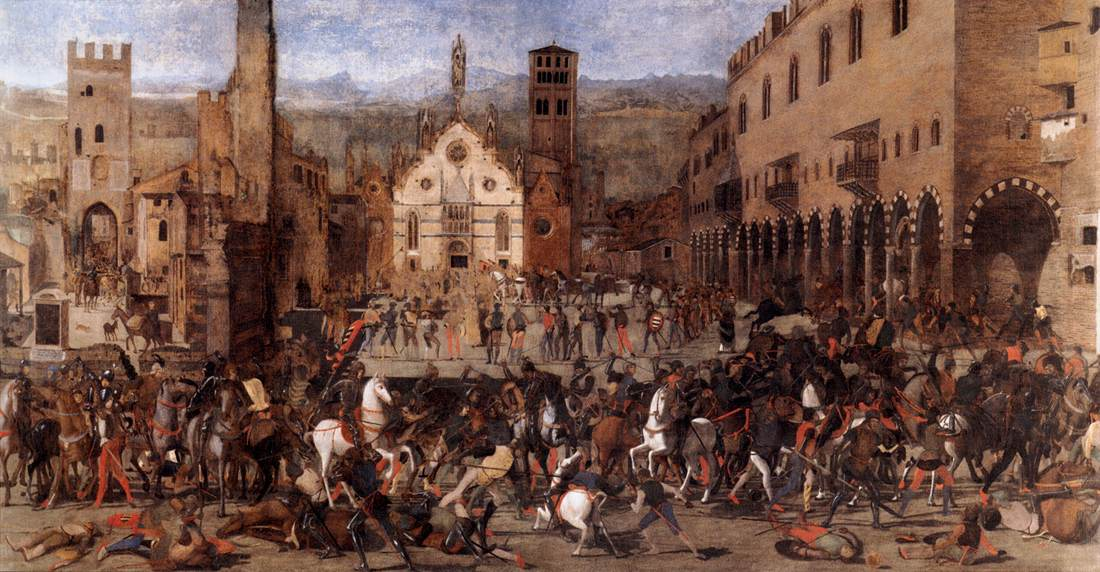
Battle between the Gonzaga and the Bonacolsi, Domenico Morone, 1494

In 1395 Francesco I Gonzaga, to celebrate the birth of his firstborn son, ordered the construction of a new facade in the Gothic style. It was carried out by the Venetian brothers Jacobello and Pierpaolo dalle Masegne. Of their original work, only the right flank of the cathedral has survived. The façade was equipped with a prothyrum, rose windows and pinnacles. The organ of the cathedral was built by Hans Tugi in c. 1503.

After another fire in 1545, Cardinal Ercole Gonzaga, then regent of the Duchy of Mantua, commissioned Giulio Romano to renovate the church. Romano left the facade and perimeter walls intact but substantially altered the interior, transforming it into a form similar to the ancient early Christian version of St. Peter's Basilica in Rome. Notable characteristics of the Renaissance structure are the cusps, decorated with rose windows on the south side, which end at the Romanesque bell tower. After Giulio Romano's death in 1546, the work continued under Giovan Battista Bertani.

During the period of French occupation, the cathedral was subjected to heavy Napoleonic spoliation. The altarpiece Temptations of St. Anthony the Abbot, by Paolo Veronese was among the 10 canvases in the Cathedral of Mantua, commissioned from Veronese and Mantuan artists by Cardinal Ercole Gonzaga in the mid-1500s that are now in the Museum of Caen, Normandy, from the time of the Napoleonic occupation.

== Architecture ==
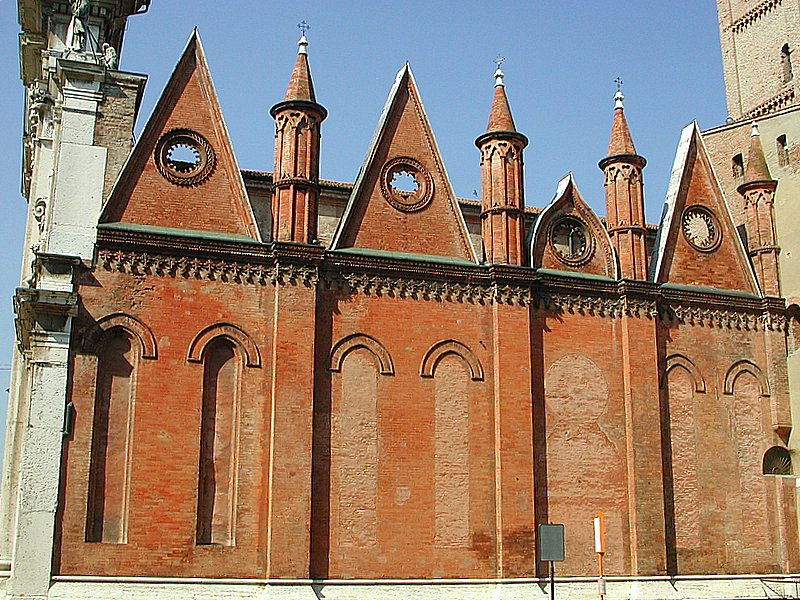
South side

The cathedral is an overlay of three styles: the late Baroque facade, the Gothic left flank, and the Romanesque bell tower.

On the initiative of Bishop Antonio Guidi of Bagno, the present facade, completely made of Carrara marble, was built between 1756 and 1761 to the design of the Roman Nicolò Baschiera, an engineer of the Austrian army. The commission for the work was given to Giovanni Angelo Finali (1709-1772), an artist from Valsolda long active in Verona, who was also the author of the statues placed on the facade, along with sculptor Giuseppe Tivani. The central part of the facade, where the three portals open, is punctuated by four Corinthian pilasters and surmounted by a triangular pediment.

On the tympanum are statues of St. Celestine, St. Peter, St. Paul and St. Anselm, while on the side bodies, again from left to right, are those of St. Speciosa, St. Luigi Gonzaga, St. John Bono and Blessed Osanna Andreasi.

Along the right flank, the 15th-century crowning spires and spires can still be seen; the Romanesque bell tower houses a concert of seven bells, of which the 6 big ones are tuned according to the scale of B♭2 major and the small one is an octave above the big bell. The largest is excellent work by the unsurpassed 18th-century master Giuseppe Ruffini. The remainder were cast by the Cavadini firm of Verona in the first half of the 19th century.

== Interior ==
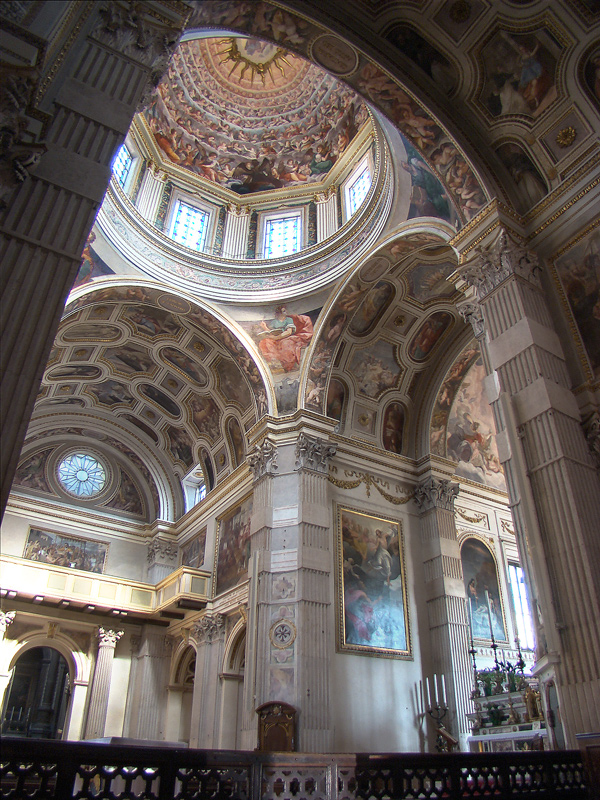
Interior

The interior of the cathedral is Latin cross, with a hall divided into five aisles by four rows of fluted Corinthian columns. The two outer side aisles and the nave are covered with a flat coffered ceiling; the two inner side aisles are covered with barrel vaults.

The dome has an octagonal drum but no lantern. The high altar is in polychrome marble and is surmounted by a carved wooden Crucifix. Ippolito Andreasi and Teodoro Ghisi painting the ceiling and cupola for Bishop Francesco Gonzaga.

The vault of the 15th-century Sacristy is decorated with medallions of the Mantegna school.

== Chapels ==
The left arm of the transept ends in the Chapel of the Blessed Sacrament, which was built in the 17th century, decorated in the late 17th century and linked to the cult of the relic of the blood of Christ. The altarpiece Saint Martin dividing his cloak with the beggar is by Paolo Farinati (1552). It also contains a painting of Saint Margaret by Domenico Brusasorci (1552) Also on the left side is the shrine of the Crowned Virgin perhaps designed by Luca Fancelli around 1480.

Along each of the two outer side aisles is a row of side chapels, whose altars are adorned with altarpieces by the most important artists of Mannerism in Mantua (the canvases by Paolo Veronese and Giulio Campi, the most important of the cycle, are no longer in Mantua today). The chapels were not actually present in Giulio Romano's original plan, as he designed two more naves there.

The left aisle includes altars dedicated to the devotions of several saints. First in sequence from the entrance to the cathedral is the altar of St. Agatha, with a painting by Ippolito Costa from 1552. Following in sequence are altars dedicated to Saint Speciosa, Saint Lucia and Saint Pius X, bishop of Mantua from 1884 to 1893. The altarpieces present are respectively by Giovanni Battista Bertani, Fermo Ghisoni, and Alessandro Dal Prato (1909-2002).

== Other interior artwork ==
- The Trinity with the Virgin, Saint John and angels by Antonio Maria Viani (fresco in apse)
- Glory of Saint Joseph (1616) by Niccolò Ricciolini
- Saint Dominic by Bernardino Malpizzi
- Madonna dell'Itria by Antonio Maria Viani
- Saint Aloysius Gonzaga by Ippolito Andreasi
- Saint Speciosa by Giovan Battista Bertani

== Pipe organ ==
On the chancel of the right arm of the transept is the cathedral's pipe organ, built by the Cremasque organ company Benzi-Franceschini in 1915 and later restored and enlarged several times. Routine maintenance is performed by the Micheli firm of Volta Mantovana.

The instrument has electropneumatic transmission, with an independent mobile console located on the floor in the transept near the chancel, having two keyboards of 61 notes each and a concave-radial pedalboard of 32 notes. The neoclassical case, made of carved and gilded wood, is derived from the earlier instrument of the first half of the 19th century and was designed by Giambattista Marconi; it has the exposition composed of three main reed cusps with horizontally aligned shield mouths.

=== Musicians ===
- Rossino Mantovano (fl. 1505–1511), maestro di canto at the Mantua Cathedral in 1510-1511
- Ruggier Trofeo (c. 1550-1614), organist at the Mantua Cathedral in 1576-1577
- Ippolito Baccusi (c. 1550 – 1609), mastro di cappella at the Mantua Cathedral from 1583-1591
- Lodovico Grossi da Viadana (c. 1560 – 1627), mastro di cappella at the Mantua Cathedral from 1594-1596

== Burials ==
- Boniface of Canossa (†1052), father of Countess Matilda
- Anselm of Lucca, patron saint of the city who died in 1086
- Blessed Giacomo Benefatti (†1332) bishop of the city in 1304
- Ludovico I Gonzaga (†1360) founder of the Gonzaga dynasty
- Ludovico III Gonzaga, Marquis of Mantua
- Filippino Gonzaga, son of Luigi Gonzaga
- Antonio degli Uberti, bishop of Mantua from 1390 to 1417
- Galeazzo Cavriani, bishop of Mantua from 1444 to 1466
- Ludovico III Gonzaga, (†1478) 2nd marquis of Mantua
- Barbara of Brandenburg (†1481) wife of Ludovico III Gonzaga
- Osanna Andreasi, (†1505) venerated as blessed
- Ferrante Gonzaga (†1557) count of Guastalla
- Ercole Gonzaga, (†1563) cardinal
- Federico Gonzaga, (†1565) cardinal and bishop of Mantua
- Eleanor of Austria, (†1594) wife of William Gonzaga
- Francesco Gonzaga, (†1620) bishop of Mantua
- Giovanni Benedetto Castiglione (†1664) painter and engraver
- Giovanni Corti, (†1868) bishop of Mantua
- Paolo Carlo Francesco Origo, (†1928) bishop of Mantua
- Carlo Ferrari, bishop of Mantua

== See also ==
- 16th-century Western domes
