= San Martino, Mantua =

Church building in Mantua, Italy

Coordinates: 45.1556°N 10.7963°E

Church of San Martino
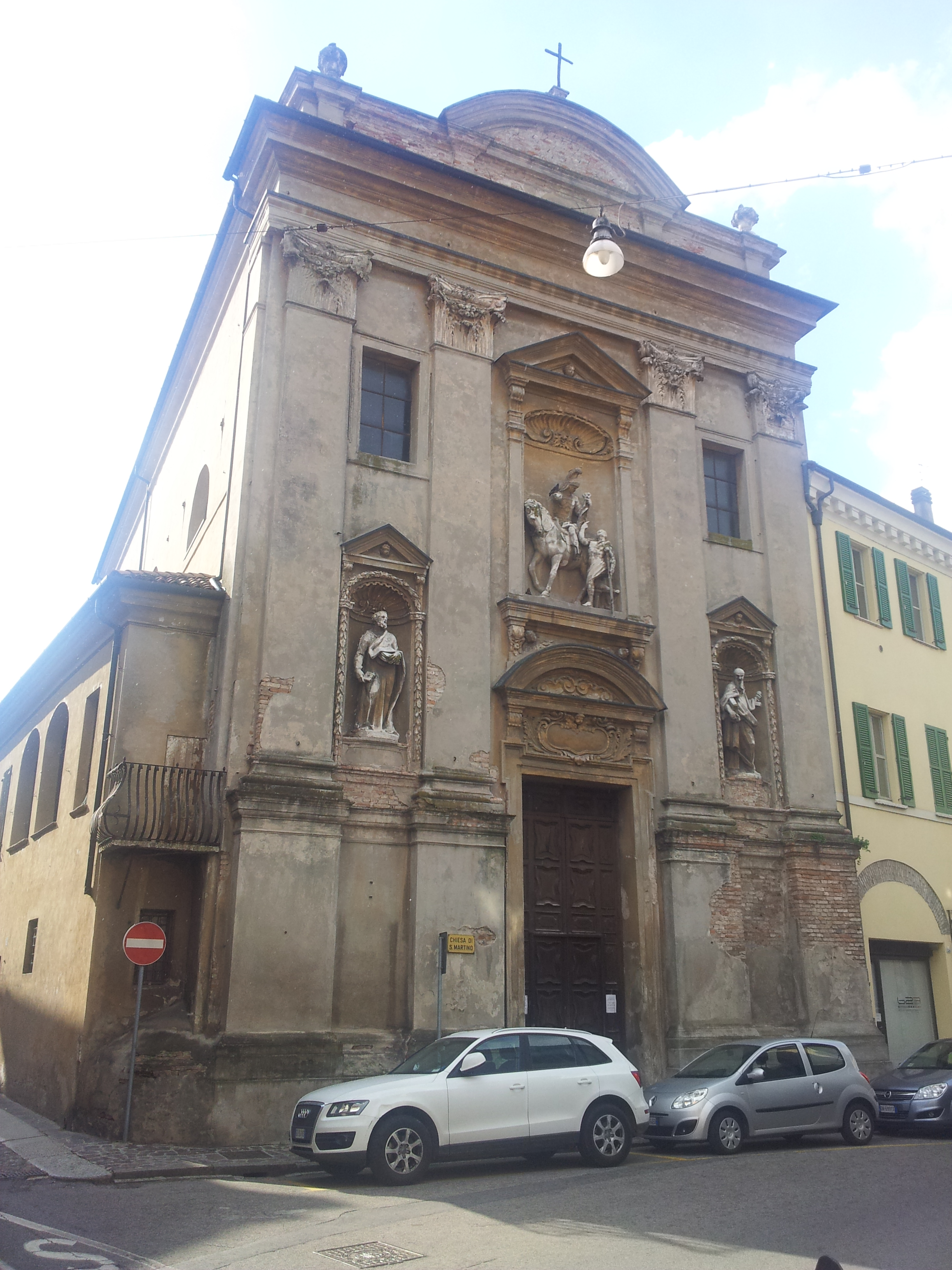

Religion
- Affiliation: Roman Catholic

Location
- Location: Mantua, Italy
- Interactive map of Church of San Martino

Architecture
- Type: Church
- Style: Baroque
- Completed: 18th century

The church of San Martino, dedicated to St Martin of Tours is a Baroque architecture, Roman Catholic church located on Via Pomponazzo in a quartiere once known as San Martino in Mantua, region of Lombardy, Italy.

== History ==
A church at the site is documented by 1127, with the prior belonging to the Benedictine Abbey of Polirone. The simple church underwent major reconstruction from 1680 to 1693 using designs of the Flemish architect and painter Frans Geffels. The vertical façade is highly encrusted with decoration, and has three niches with stucco 18th century statues depicting St Martin donating cloak to poor (center) and Saints Peter and Paul. The interior also has an elaborate stucco decoration in the style of Michele Costa, as well as a large canvas by Gian Francesco Tura of a Madonna with Child with Saints.

A number of other paintings were moved here after the Napoleonic suppression. Among the artworks are:

- The Soldier Martin divides his clothes with the beggar by Ippolito Costa
- St Martin resuscitates a child by Luigi Niccolini
- A series of canvases of Saints and Beatified citizens along the lateral walls including : Blessed Osanna Andreasi, Blessed Paola Montaldi, San Giovanni Bono, and Saint Aloysius Gonzaga by Luigi Niccolini
- Madonna with Child and Saints by Giovanni Francesco Tura
- Madonna with child, St Anne, and St Joseph by Pietro Fabbri (1730)
- Annunciation oval canvas by Giovanni Canti
- Holy Family by Dionisio Mancini
- St Barbara by Carlo Mancini, father of Dionisio Mancini
- St Mary Magdalen Penitent by Teodoro Ghisi

== Bibliography ==
- Luisa Masè e Giuseppe Ciaghi, “Altare Comunitatis”, ed. Centro Studi Val Rendena, Pinzolo 2004
- Maria Giuseppina Sordi, La chiesa di San Martino in Mantova, La Reggia - anno XV - settembre 2006 n° 3 (57), parte II, Mantova
- Maria Giuseppina Sordi, La chiesa di San Martino in Mantova, La Reggia - anno XV - dicembre 2006 n° 4 (58), parte II, Mantova
