= Guérillot =

Guérillot (English: /ɡɛriːˈjoʊ/, French: [ɡeʁijo]) is a surname. Notable people with the surname include:

- Amanzia Guérillot (1828–1886), Italian artist of French heritage
- Roger Guérillot (1904–1971), French politician and diplomat
