= Finali (surname) =

Finali is an Italian-origin surname. Notable people with the surname include:

- Gaspare Finali (1829–1914), Italian politician
- Giovanni Angelo Finali (1709–1772), Italian sculptor
