= Frans Geffels =

Flemish painter

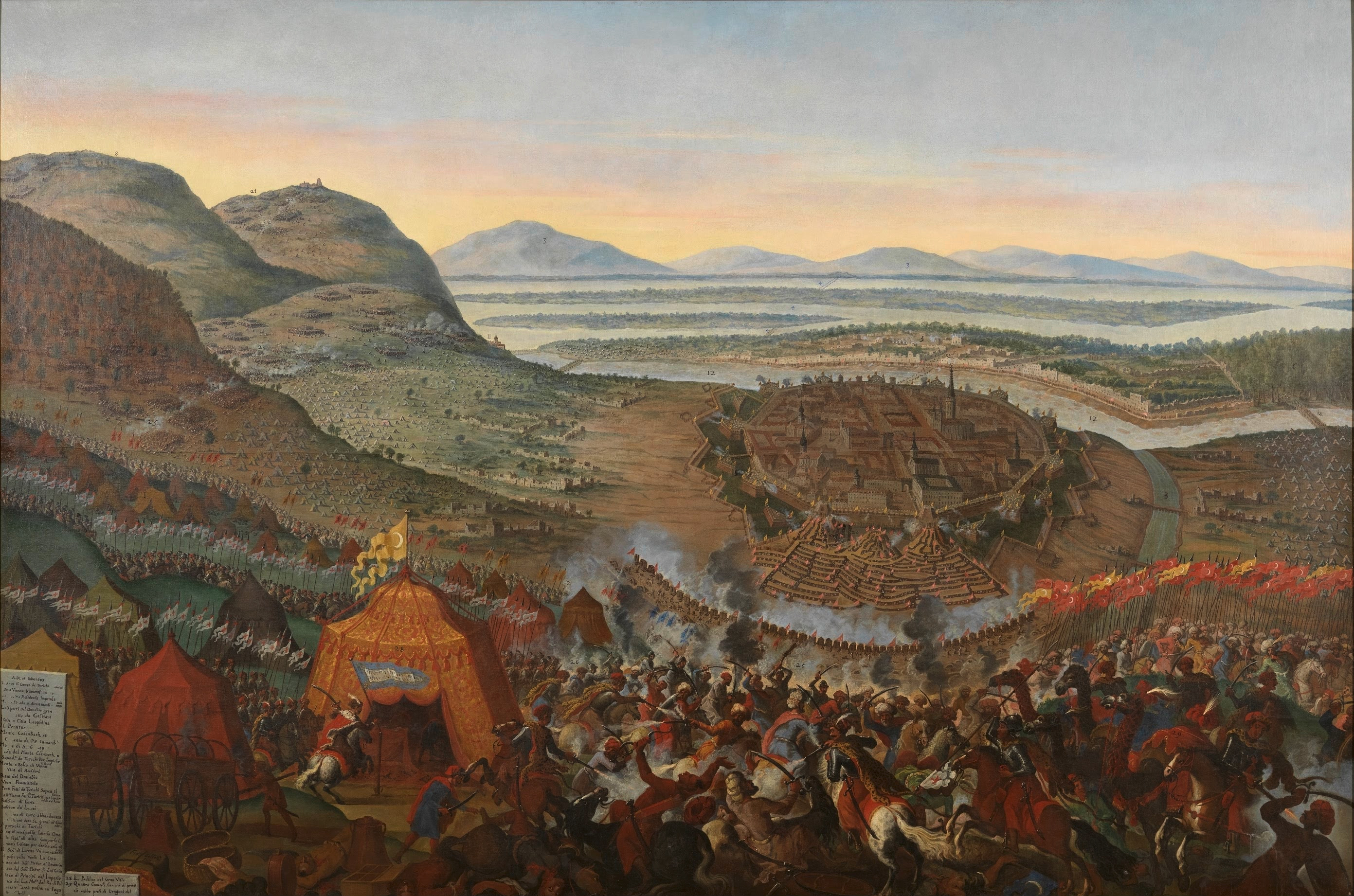
- The Relief of Vienna
- Born: 1625; Antwerp
- Died: 1694 (aged 68–69); Mantua
- Known for: Painting, architecture, printmaking
- Movement: Baroque
- Patrons: House of Gonzaga, Mantua

Frans Geffels, known in Italy as Francesco Geffels (25 August 1624 – 18 February 1694), was a Flemish painter, printmaker, architect, stage designer and designer of ephemeral structures for solemn and festive occasions. After training in his native Antwerp, he was mainly active in Mantua, where he was prefetto delle fabbriche to the Duke, a role that gave him the direction of the artistic and construction activities undertaken by the Ducal court. He worked also on projects for the local aristocratic class of Mantua. In addition, he completed projects for the Liechtenstein princes and for the imperial court in Vienna.

He was both a canvas and fresco painter. He created portraits, history subjects, military scenes, architectural scenes and genre art, in particular merry companies. Geffels is mainly remembered as the designer of some of the key examples of Baroque architecture in Mantua.

== Life ==
He was born in Antwerp as the son of a laborer in a sugar refinery and a mother who operated a cheese shop. He trained in the guild year 1635/36 with Daniel Middeleer (also called Daniel Middeler and Daniël de Middelaer). Middeleer was a painter, printmaker and publisher. Geffels became a master in the local Guild of St. Luke some time between 18 September 1645 and 18 September 1646. By 1653 he was already abroad for some time.

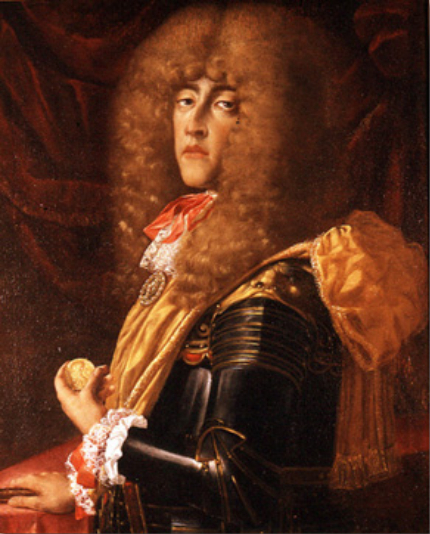
Portrait of Ferdinando Carlo Gonzaga

He was likely recruited to work in Mantua in 1659, by his fellow Flemish painter and architect Daniel van den Dyck. Van den Dyck had been appointed by duke Carlo II Gonzaga, Duke of Mantua as the prefetto delle fabbriche ('Prefect of the Buildings'), a position which combined the duties of official court painter, architect, surveyor of the Ducal construction program and engineer for theatrical stage design. Geffels was working as an architect at the court.

Geffens spent some time in Vienna in 1660-1661 where he worked for the Imperial Court. He returned to Mantua where he became, like van den Dyck before him, prefetto delle fabbriche of the duke of Mantua in 1663. He took the place of his compatriot van den Dyck who had died in the previous year. In 1664 Geffens was granted citizenship of Mantua. He was described in official records as an artist who was skilled in creating devices for the theatre.

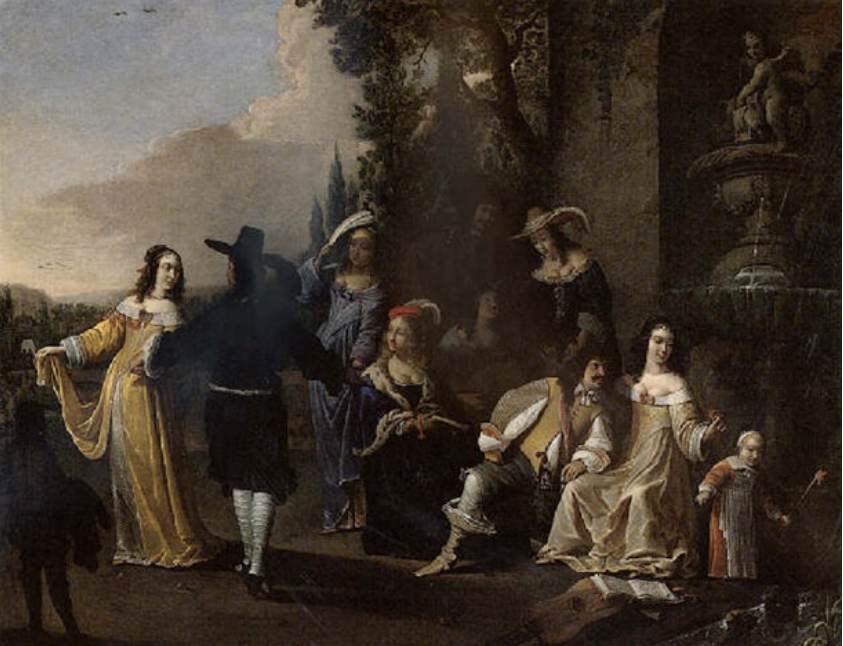
Figures playing music and dancing in a garden

Geffels remained in the service of the Dukes of Mantua for 30 years. He worked in 1667 in Vienna on commissions for Karl Eusebius, Prince of Liechtenstein. There existed a close relationship between the Viennese court and the dukes of Mantua through marital links. The Empress Dowager Eleonora Gonzaga (1630–1686) was the third wife of Emperor Ferdinand III and the sister of Charles II Gonzaga, Duke of Nevers. He also participated on a book containing the libretto by Francesco Sbarra for the opera Il pomo d'oro scored by Antonio Cesti, which was staged twice in July 1668 on the occasion of the marriage of Emperor Leopold I and Margaret Theresa of Spain. The book was illustrated with prints depicting the various sets used during the staging of the opera. The folio de luxe edition of the book holds a print designed and etched by Geffels showing the opera's performance with Emperor Leopold I and his bride in attendance. The theatre in which the opera was staged had been purpose-built on the occasion of the couple's wedding after a design by Ludovico Ottavio Burnacini. The theatre was destroyed during the Turkish siege of Vienna in 1683 and Geffens' print now serves as the sole evidence of the interior layout of the theatre. In the print, the imperial family is shown sitting at the front. In the foreground there is a row of soldiers. Geffels had himself worked on the illusionist ceiling paintings for the court theatre, which are also shown in the print.

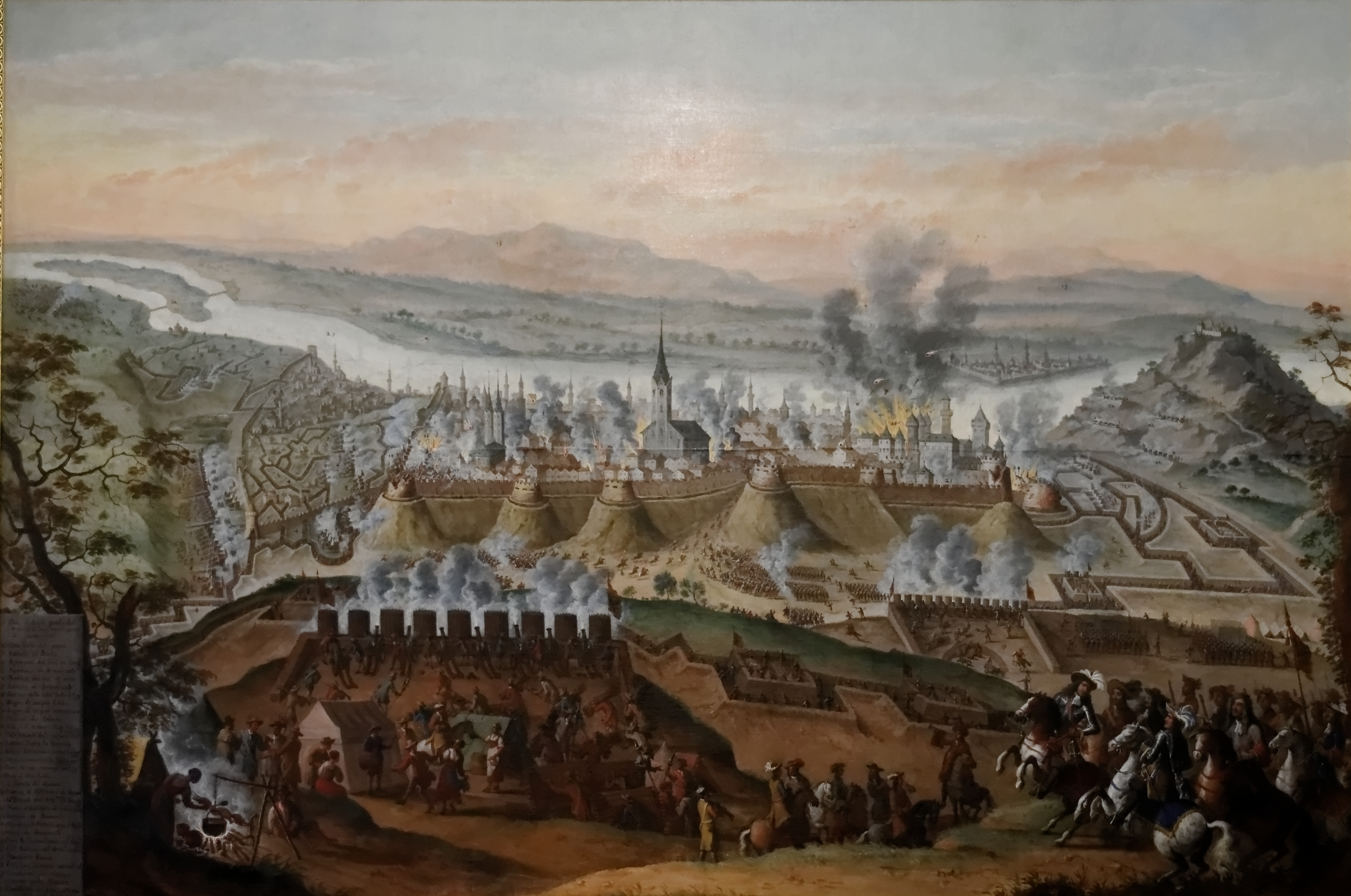
Retaking of Buda

Even after his return to Mantua later in 1668, Geffels maintained contact with the Viennese court, as evidenced by his collaboration on the three-volume book by Gualdo Priorato with the title Historia di Leopoldo Cesare and also by his paintings depicting the Relief of Vienna in 1683 (Wien Museum Karlsplatz) and the Retaking of Buda in 1686 (Hungarian National Museum).

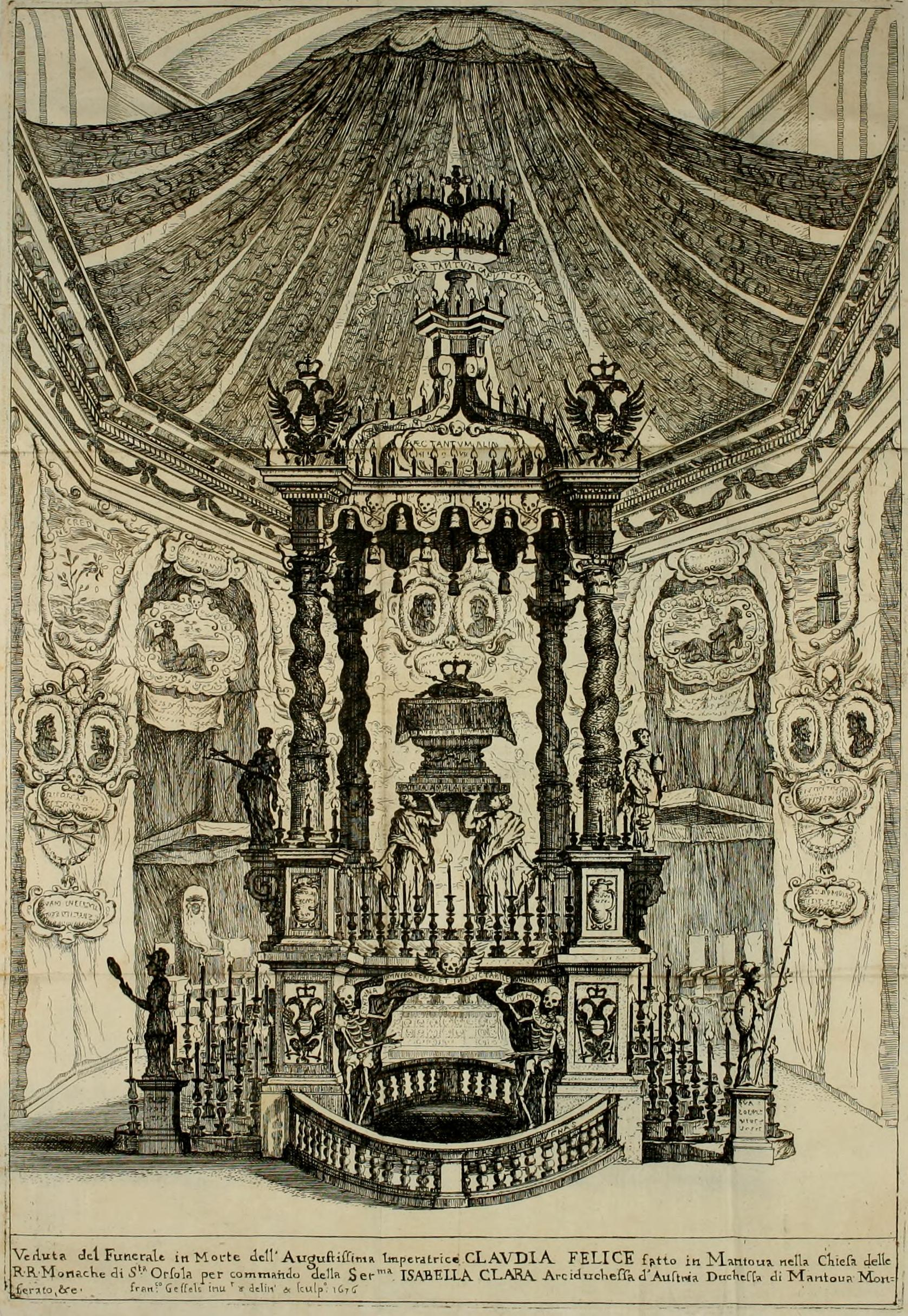
Design for funeral monument of Claudia Felicitas of Austria

Geffens' official duties at the Mantua court included the design and execution of ephemeral objects and structures used on the occasion of important court-related events. In January 1666 he collaborated with Andrea Seghizzi on the decorations and objects made for the funeral of Duke Charles II Gonzaga, Duke of Nevers in the Basilica palatina di Santa Barbara in Mantua. When in 1676 Empress Claudia Felicitas of Austria died in Vienna not long after giving birth, her aunt Isabella Clara of Austria, Duchess of Mantua, had a funeral mass performed in the church of the Mothers of St. Ursula of Mantua, where the Duchess had become a Poor Clare nun. Frans Geffels was commissioned to design and construct a funeral monument that was set up in the middle of the church during the mass. It was mounted on four large marble-coloured pedestals, adorned on the top front with imperial eagles in low-relief. A print of the design was included in the book by Antonio Gobio and Geffels entitled Le essequie celebratesi nella chiesa delle MM. RR. Madri di S. Orsola di Mantoua: d'ordine della serenissima signora arciduchessa Isabella Clara d' Austria, duchessa di Mantoua, Monferrato, &c., per la morte dell' imperatrice augustissima Claudia Felice lei nipote published in Mantua in 1676 by Francesco Osanna, printer to the Duke.

As a court painter and architect, Geffels was not prohibited from taking on private commissions. An important private commission was the redesigning of the Sordi Palace for Benedetto Sordi. He created frescoes in the palace and had the sculptor Gian Battista Barberini provide sculptured decoration of the façade and interior of the palace.

He remained in office until his death in Mantua on 18 February 1694. He was buried in the Church of San Martino which he had himself redesigned. He was the last prefetto delle fabbriche of the duke of Mantua as the role was split over multiple persons after his death.

== Paintings ==
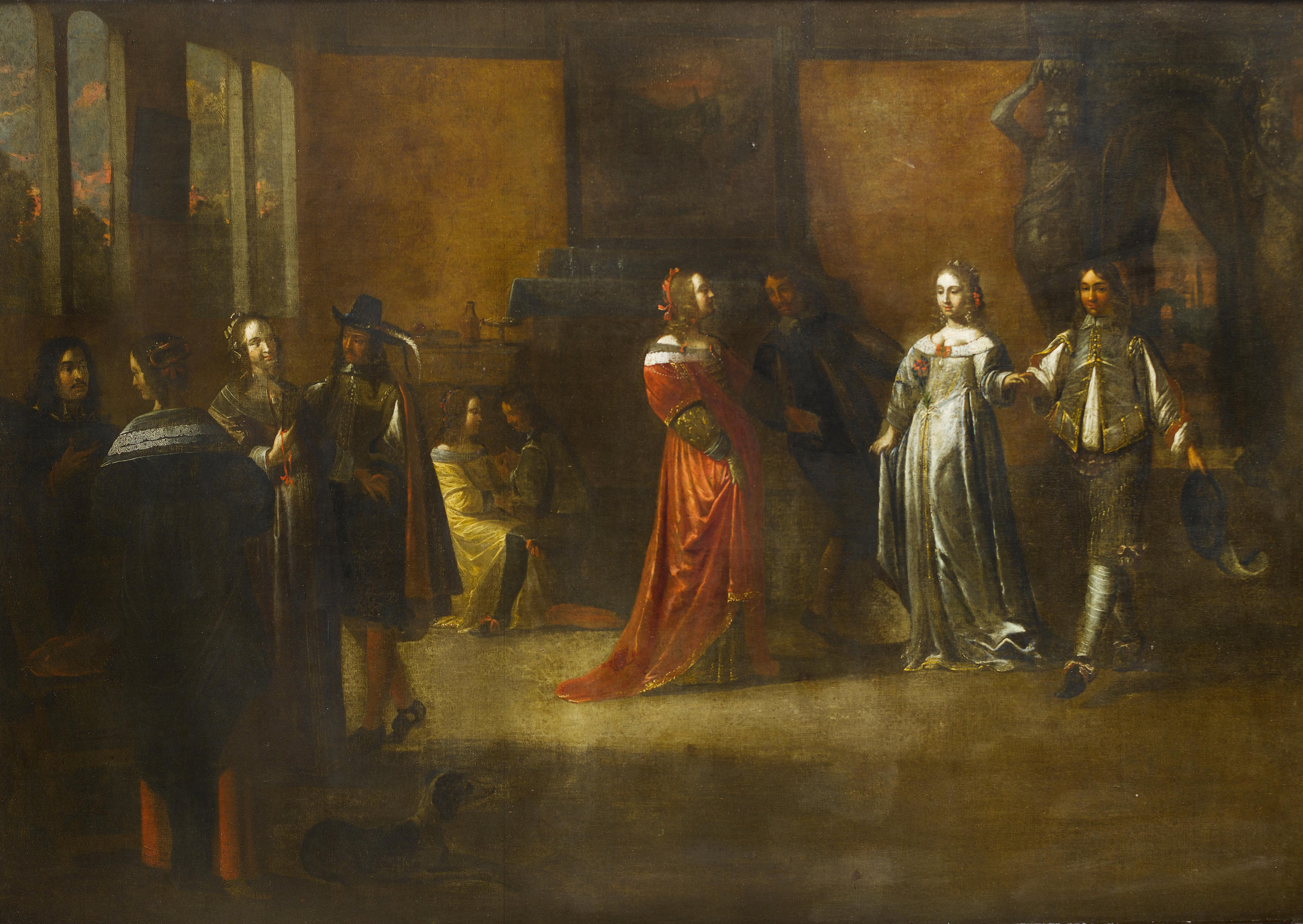
Elegant figures merrymaking in an interior

He was both a canvas and fresco painter. He painted portraits, history subjects, military scenes, architectural scenes and genre scenes such as merry companies. He is in particular known for his perspective views of two important military battles against Turkish forces: the Relief of Vienna (Vienna Museum at Karlsplatz) and the Retaking of Buda (Hungarian National Museum). Both paintings provide a bird's eye view of the military action with a view of the besieged city in the distance. Both paintings have in the lower left corner a legend which describe key locations in the battle scene which are each identified by a number in the painting. For the Retaking of Buda Geffels based his topographically correct view on an extremely rare print engraved by the Vienna-based engravers Johann Martin Lerch and Johann Jakob Hofmann after a drawing by the Dutch artist Justus van den Nypoort. For the Relief of Vienna Geffels relied on a print engraved by Johann Jakob Hofmann after a design by Justus van den Nypoort published soon after the events happened.

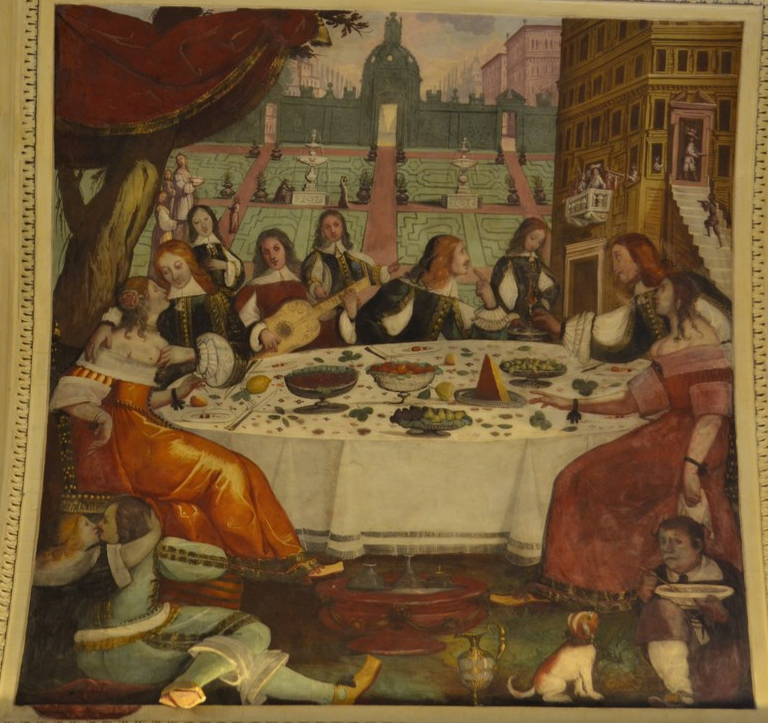
Prodigal son in wild living

Two portraits of Ferdinando Carlo Gonzaga di Nevers have been attributed to Geffels. The portrait in the Palazzo d'Arco in Mantua has been attributed on the basis of a print made after the portrait which identifies Geffels as the designer. The second portrait is in the Palazzo Sordi. A pendant to this picture depicts the Duke's wife. The portrait shows the Duke at full length with a page on his side who is handing him a letter on a pewter plate. The Duke is wearing a heavy blue coat. The face is rendered with very recognizable features and an absent expression.

Geffels was also a genre painter. A number of merry companies of elegant figures engaging in play, dance, dinner or music playing are attributed to Geffels. His Dinner Party on a Terrace, (Philadelphia Museum of Art, 1660s) was previously attributed to the Dutch painter Pieter de Hooch. Geffels also painted some paintings of the humbler classes of society, which recalls the paintings of the Bamboccianti. An example is the Antique ruins with a Roma family (Museum of Fine Arts (Budapest), 1660s). It shows some figures who may be Romani people possibly preparing a meal and a shepherd with a herd inside a tunnel-like grotto with Antique architectural elements. The iconographic interpretation of the work is not entirely clear. The inscription 'TEMPORALE AET (E) RNITAS' (temporary eternity) can be read on the relief of the pedestal of a tomb depicted on the left. This may be a reference to the theme of vanitas, i.e. the reflection on the transience of earthly things in general. Below the text there is a relief possibly depicting a sacrificial scene: a female figure is standing on a pedestal with her eyes looking up while at her feet children hold up a garland and the face of an old bearded man is placed between the two children. The tunnel in the picture is likely not an existing Antique structure but was created by combining motifs from different locations, which Geffels may have known through print publications. The work with its complex perspective of the tunnel grotto demonstrates how Geffels was able to put his skill as an architect and theatrical designer to good use in his paintings.

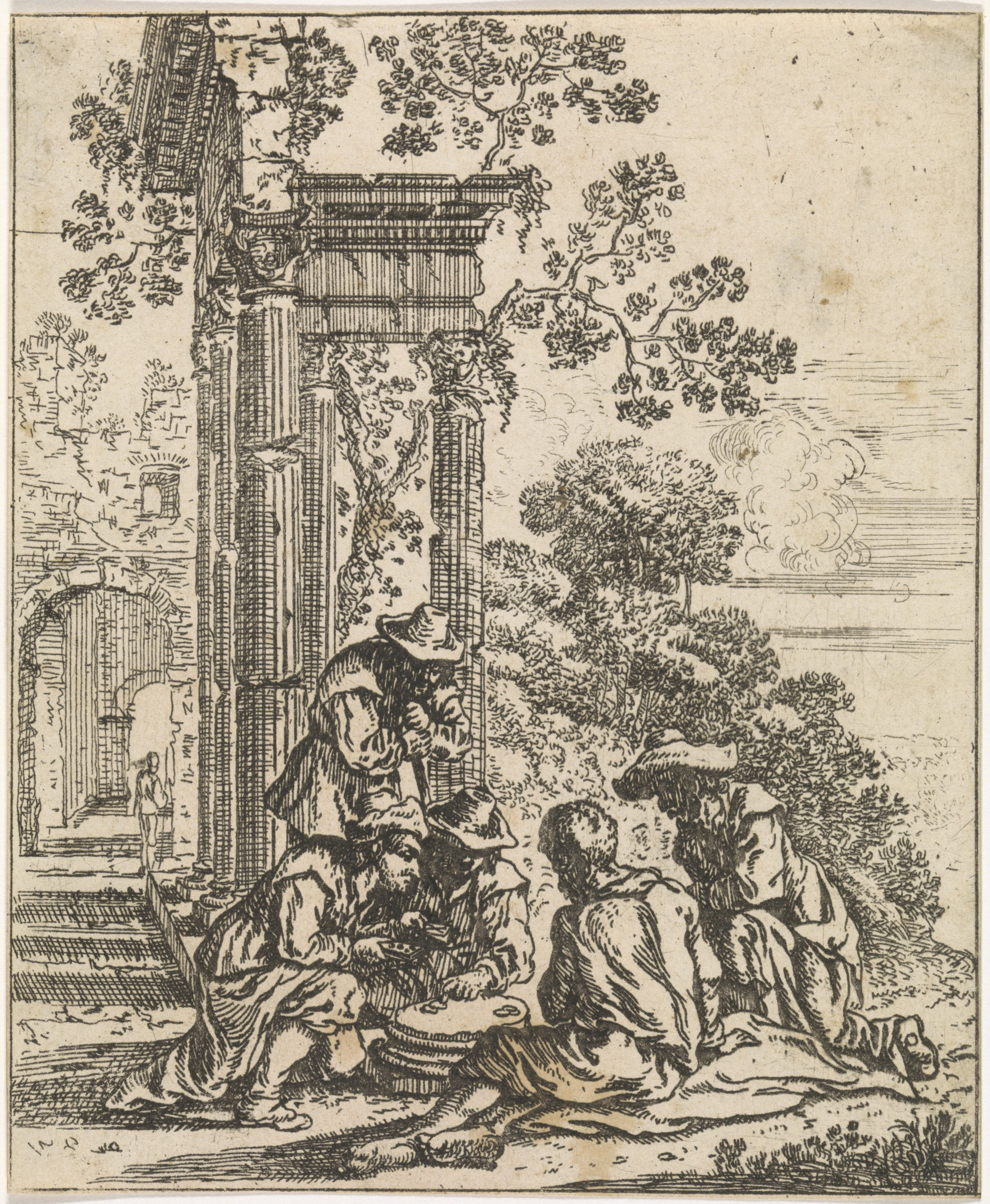
Classical ruins with card players

Finally, Geffels also painted religious subjects. He painted an Altarpiece of the Christian Doctrine in the church of San Martino in Mantua. He further painted on the ceiling of a room in the Palazzo Valenti-Gonzaga a series of frescoes on the theme of the Prodigal Son.

== Prints ==
Geffels was a printmaker and designer of prints. A number of these prints illustrated ephemeral objects that he had designed himself. This is the case of the Design for the funeral monument of Claudia Felicitas of Austria and the Structures for the funeral of Charles II Gonzaga Nevers.

His interest in Bamboccianti subjects is also shown in his series of etchings of Italian landscapes, buildings and ruins. This series of seven plates includes a frontispiece with a dedication to Marchese Ottavio Gonzaga and six prints showing figures amidst classical ruins. The plates have been etched with a broad needle and are heavily etched. Among these, the most ingenious and effective is the one in which, in front of a column ruin and some bushes in the back, five crooks are trading or playing cards on top of a using a column base.

Geffels collaborated on the publication of Galeazzo Gualdo Priorato's Historia di Leopoldo Cesare, published by Johann Baptist Hacque in Vienna (vols. 1-2, 1670; vol. 3, 1674). The first volume described the political and military successes of Emperor Leopold I between 1656 and 1670. It was illustrated with prints after designs primarily by Netherlandish artists with portraits of European monarchs and important aristocrats, as well as castle scenes, battle scenes, maps and ceremonies. Apart from Geffels whose portrait designs were used for some of the prints, the Dutch and Flemish artists contributing were Cornelis Meyssens, Jan de Herdt, Franciscus van der Steen, Gerard Bouttats, Adriaen van Bloemen, Jacob Toorenvliet, Leonard Hendrik van Otteren (fl. 1670 - 1713) and Sebastian van Dryweghen (fl. 1670-76). German and Italian artists Moritz Lang (fl. c. 1647 - 1670), Johann Martin Lerch (1643 - 1693), Johann Holst (fl. 17th century), Marco Boschini and 'Il Bianchi' also contributed.

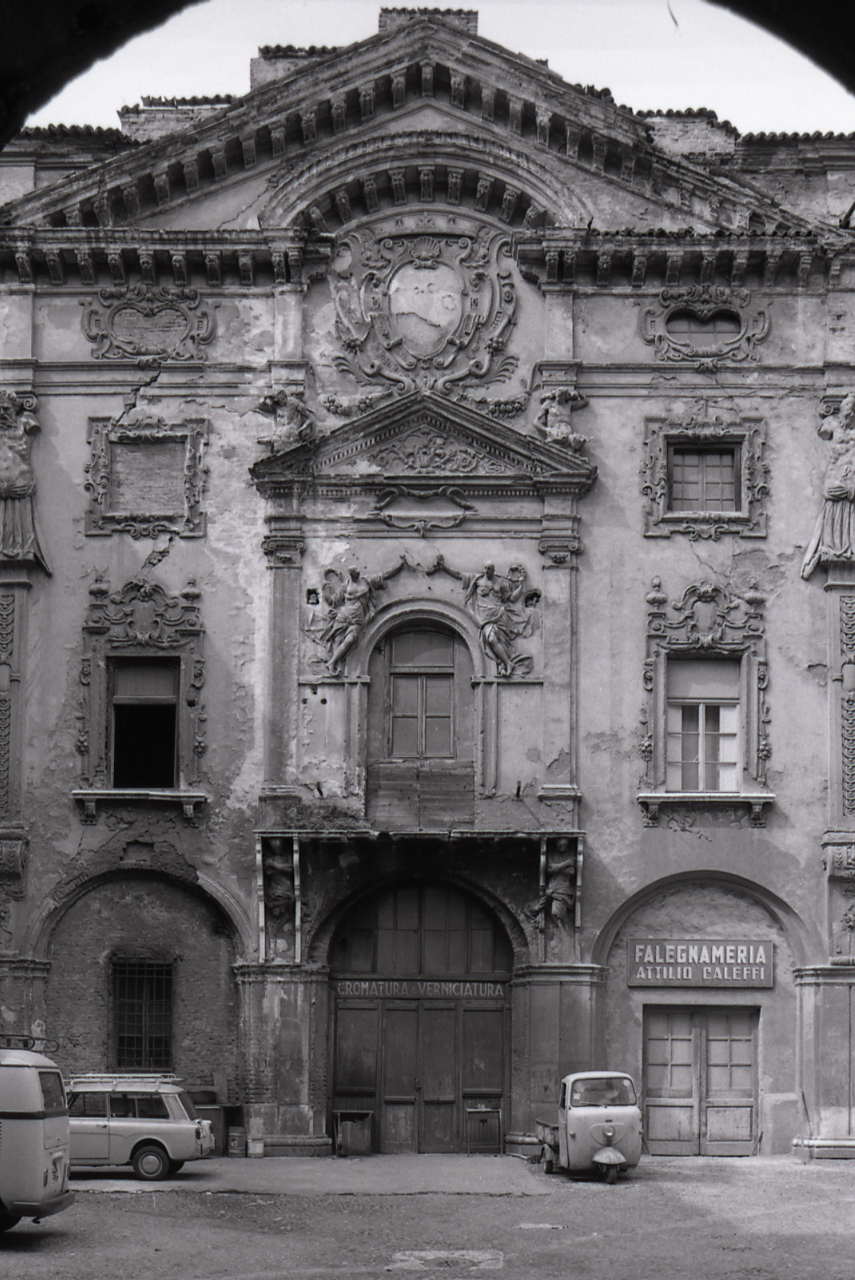
Façade of the inner courtyard of Palazzo Valenti Gonzaga

== Architectural works in Mantua ==
Geffels is mainly remembered for his architectural projects in Mantua. It is not clear where Geffels obtained his architectural training. In his native Antwerp he must have familiarised himself with the home and workshop and annex courtyard garden that Peter Paul Rubens had designed for himself based on his artistic ideals. Rubens had further published in 1622 the Palazzi di Genova, an important book illustrated by himself, which depicted and described the palaces of Genoa in Italy in 72 plates. Geffels certainly had access to this book in Antwerp. Further, working with Daniel van den Dyck during his early years in Mantua must have given him further opportunities to hone his skills as an architect. His architectural designs brought to Mantua an original blend of the Baroque design elements seen in Rubens' house in Antwerp with Italian influences, in particular from Verona and Lombardy. He also demonstrated in his designs a solid grasp of the technical aspects of architectural design.

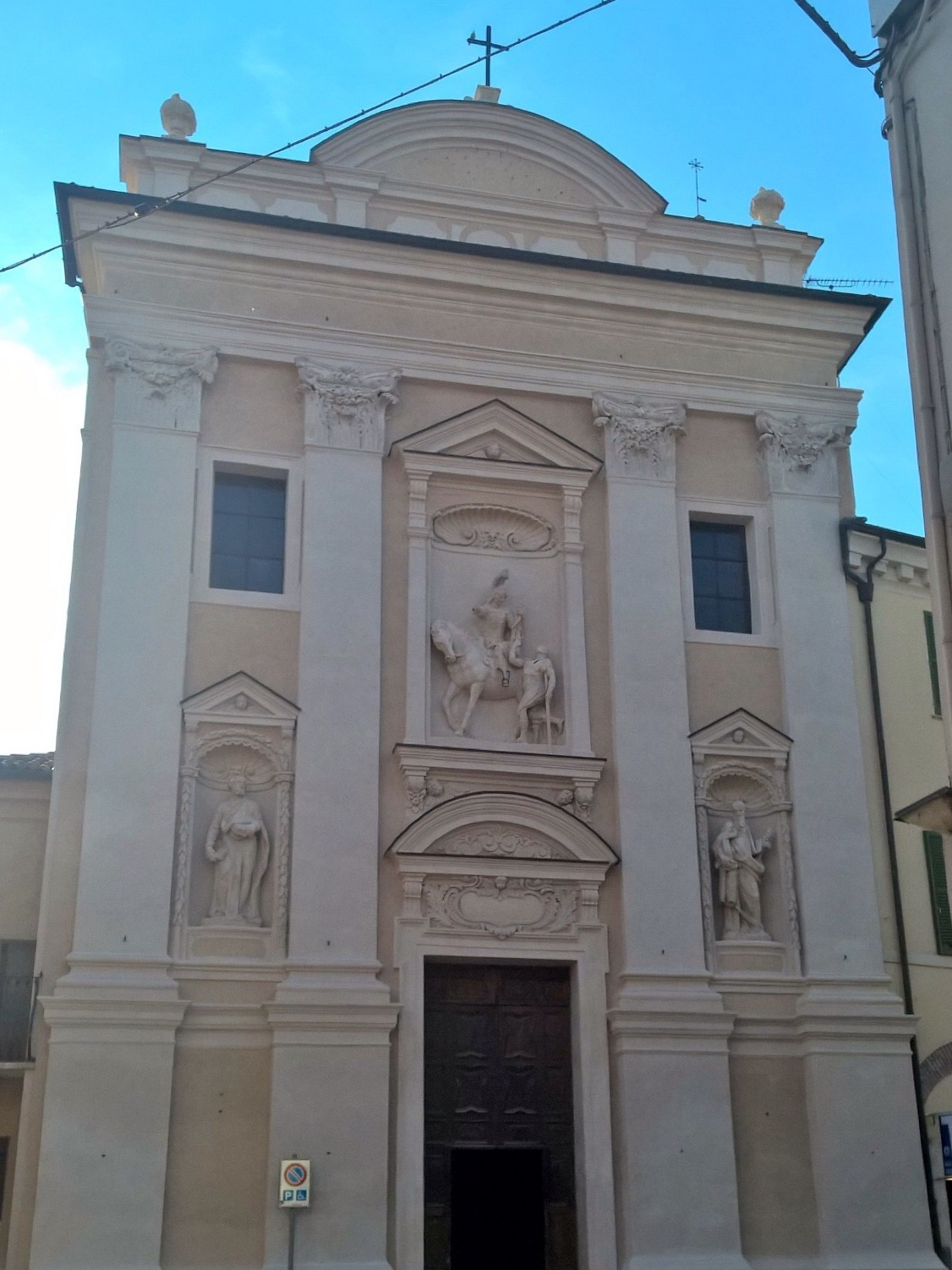
Façade of the Church of San Martino

The first palace in Mantua for which Geffels made the designs was the Palazzo Gonzaga di Vescovato in Portiolo on which he worked in 1662. He was also involved in the redesign of various other buildings including the villa of his friend Francesco Zanetti in Montanara (also known as Palazzo Cavalcabò), Zanetti's town house in via Corridoni, his own house, the Rabbi's House (1680) and the Church of San Martino in Mantua. The façade of the Church of San Martino is less Baroque then his other works. It is composed of a single giant row of four pilasters with composite capitals framing a central doorway, a rectangular window on each side, and three niches with large shells surmounted by pediments. These niches now contain plaster statues added only in 1739. In the church interior Geffels preserved the aisleless layout, which he enhanced with a decorative stucco frieze. The stuccowork was executed by Giacomo Aliprandi and Michele Costa. The reconstruction works on the church were carried out from 1680 to 1694.

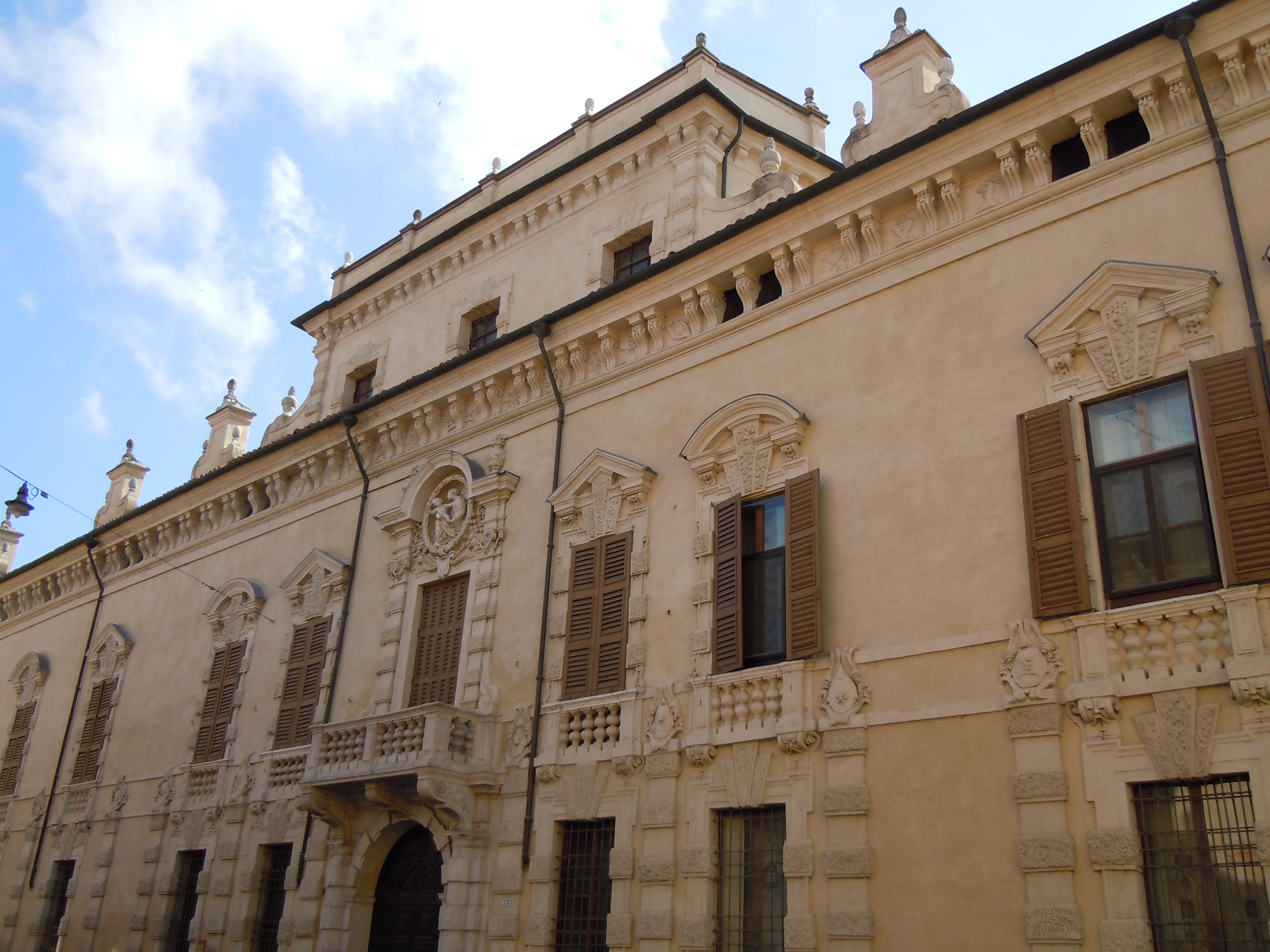
Façade of the Palazzo Sordi

He redesigned the Palazzo Valenti Gonzaga. This was a pre-existing building from the 16th century, which the owners wished to modernize. The façade was transformed into a Baroque style by another Lombard architect. Geffels' contribution is situated in the interior of the palace. He reworked the façade of the inner courtyard, which included a statue of Jove and painted decorations combined with stucco reliefs. The façade at the rear of the courtyard was also remodeled by Geffens. In the palace he redesigned the rooms. In some he painted frescoes while Gian Battista Barberini added decorative stuccowork and statues. The renovation was concluded in 1677.

In the Sordi Palace, also pre-existing, Geffels had a free hand. He worked here again with the sculptor Barberini. The Baroque façade extending over two floors shows a horizontal sequence of paired windows which contrasts with the vertical dynamic created by the balustrades on the belt course. It is richly decorated. The central reception hall is elevated above the cornice. Geffels created in some of the reception halls frescoes of battles: one of the two reception halls is named after the battle of Belgrade against the Turks, in which the owner of the palace was a participant. Gian Battista Barberini provided the rich stuccowork decoration of the façade and interior. Geffels designed an artificial natural environment, decorated with wells, stalactite caves, mythological sculptures for the palace.
