= Jacobello dalle Masegne =

Italian sculptor (1350–1409)

Jacobello dalle Masegne (c. 1350, in Venice – 1409) was an Italian sculptor of the Gothic style, active in Veneto, Lombardy, Emilia, and Romagna. He is best remembered for his work on the altar of the Santa Maria Gloriosa dei Frari, the tomb of John of Legnano, the bust of Antonio Venier, and the facade of the Mantua Cathedral. He also frequently collaborated with his brother Pierpaolo dalle Masegne.
