= Angelo Inganni =

Italian painter

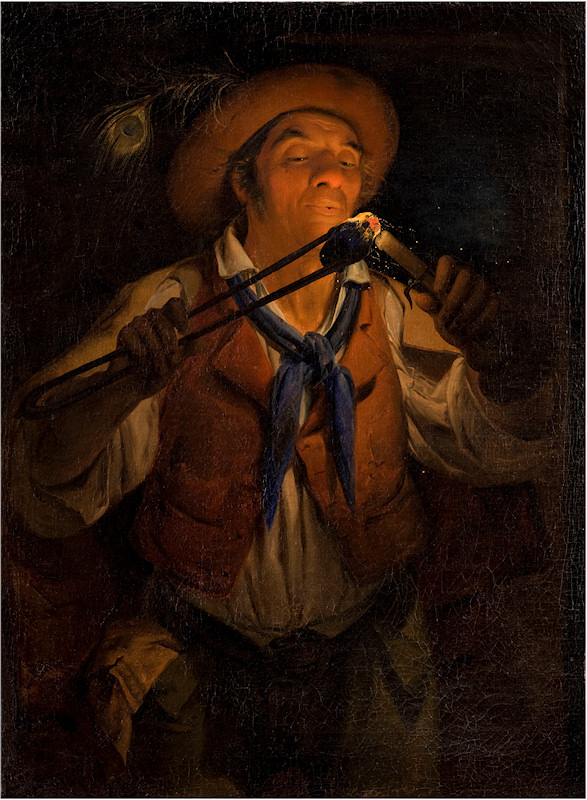
Farmer Lighting a Candle with a Burning Stick, 1850 (Fondazione Cariplo)

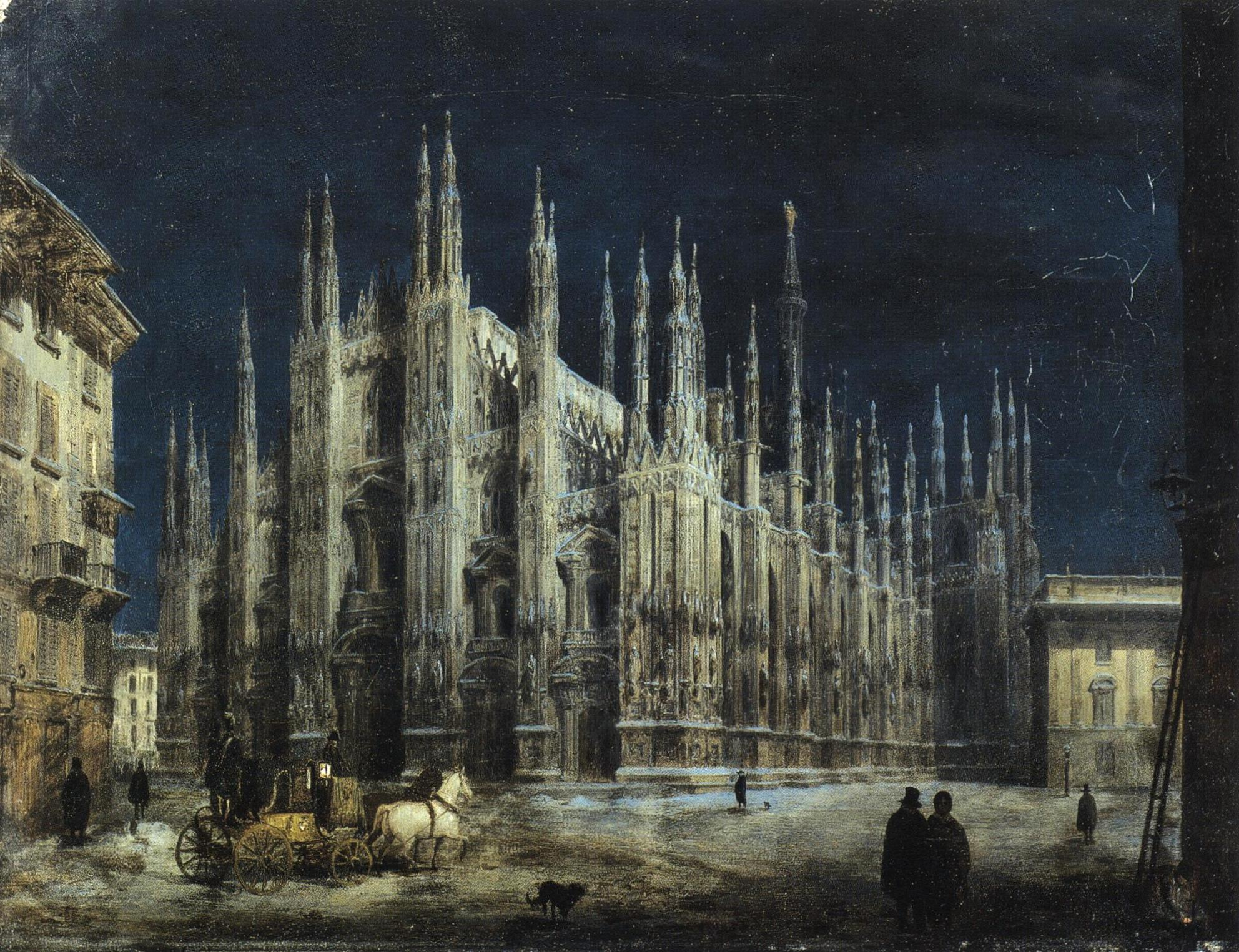
Night on the Piazza del Duomo, c. 1850s

Angelo Inganni (November 24, 1807 – December 2, 1880) was an Italian painter.

== Biography ==
Born in Brescia, Inganni was taught the basics of art by his father Giovanni and his elder brother Francesco, with whom he worked on fresco decorations from when he was young. Distinguished during his military service as a draughtsman and portraitist, he was noticed by Marshal Radetzky who had him admitted to the Brera Academy of Fine Arts in 1833.

The work he presented regularly at the Brera exhibitions from 1834 to 1859 constitutes a vast series of urban views of Milan capturing all the details of its architecture and including likenesses of real people. This new approach to perspective painting proved a great success with the public and critics alike, as shown by a number of prestigious commissions, including from the Austrian emperor in 1839.

Inganni exhibited views of various Italian cities in national and international exhibitions. It was in the 1850s, above all after his return to Brescia, that he began to produce genre works of Flemish inspiration with new subjects drawn from rural life and telling effects of light. He frescoed the churches of San Marco and San Carlo in Milan as well as the parish church of Gussago.

In 1856, three years after the death of his first wife, he married his long-time pupil and model, Amanzia Guérillot, who was twenty-one years his junior. They settled down near Gussago and often collaborated on canvases as well as small-scale decorative work. He died there in 1880.
