= Hans Tugi =

Swiss organ builder (c.1460–1519)

Hans Tugi (c. 1460–1519) was a Swiss organ builder. He was born in Basel, son of a gunsmith. He matriculated at the University of Basel in 1476-77. By the turn of the century, Tugi was one of the most important organ builders in Switzerland and south-west Germany. Places he worked at and built instruments for include the following:

- Cathedral of Konstanz (1489–90, possibly also later)
- Mantua Cathedral (1503?)
- Grossmünster of Zurich (1505–07)
- Mainz Cathedral (1514)
- Münster of Berne (1517–19)

He also worked for many years in Basel, Colmar and other cities.

== See also ==
- List of organ builders
