= Ruggier Trofeo =

Italian organist and composer (c. 1550–1614)

Ruggier Trofeo (c. 1550 – 19 September 1614) was an Italian composer and organist. His name is sometimes rendered as Ruggiero De Trofeis.

Trofeo appears to have been a native of Mantua; an anthology of music by natives of that city contains one madrigal by him, and in his 1589 book of canzonette he is described as being a "Mantuan". He was most likely a pupil of Francesco Rovigo, as several of the older composer's works were at one point combined with his own for publication. He served as organist of the Mantua Cathedral during the winter of 1576/77, acting as deputy for Annibale Coma. By 1587 he had become the organist of the Basilica palatina di Santa Barbara, in the same city. In May of that year, Trofeo was seriously wounded in an encounter with his patron, Guglielmo Gonzaga, over a woman. Musicologist David Mason Greene describes the incident thus:

In 1587, Duke Guglielmo found him in a back street chatting with a woman whose company he deemed unfitting for a church organist, and when Trofeo told him to mind his business, the duke punctured him to a considerable depth with his sword. What the duke was doing in a back street, history does not say, and he died three months later anyhow.

Other sources further record that the duke was in disguise at the time, which may account for Trofeo's reaction to his request; they also note that Gonzaga's death three months after the incident likely prevented the musician from suffering further punishment for his disobedience.

In the 1590s Trofeo took a position as organist at San Marco, Milan; sometime early in the next century he moved to Turin, performing at Turin Cathedral while acting as maestro di cappella for the chamber chapel of the House of Savoy. It was in that city that Trofeo died. His son Giovanni Cristoforo was an organist as well.

Trofeo composed a handful of works for his instrument, and in 1589 published a book of canzonette. He also produced music for instrumental ensemble. Girolamo Borsieri studied with Trofeo, likely just before he relocated to Turin; a handful of letters between the two survive, in which Borsieri apologizes for and explains his decision to abandon music for other pursuits.
