= San Marco, Milan =

Church in Milan

Church of Saint Mark (Chiesa di San Marco)
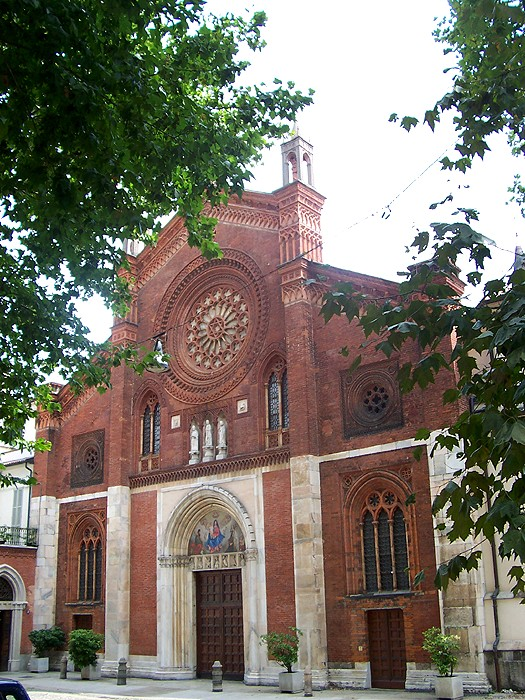
- Façade of the church

Religion
- Affiliation: Roman Catholic
- Province: Milan
- Status: Active

Location
- Location: Milan, Italy
- Interactive map of Church of Saint Mark (Chiesa di San Marco)
- Coordinates: 45°28′24″N 9°11′20″E

Architecture
- Type: Church
- Style: Gothic; Baroque; Gothic Revival
- Groundbreaking: 1245
- Completed: 19c

San Marco is a church in Milan, northern Italy.

== History ==
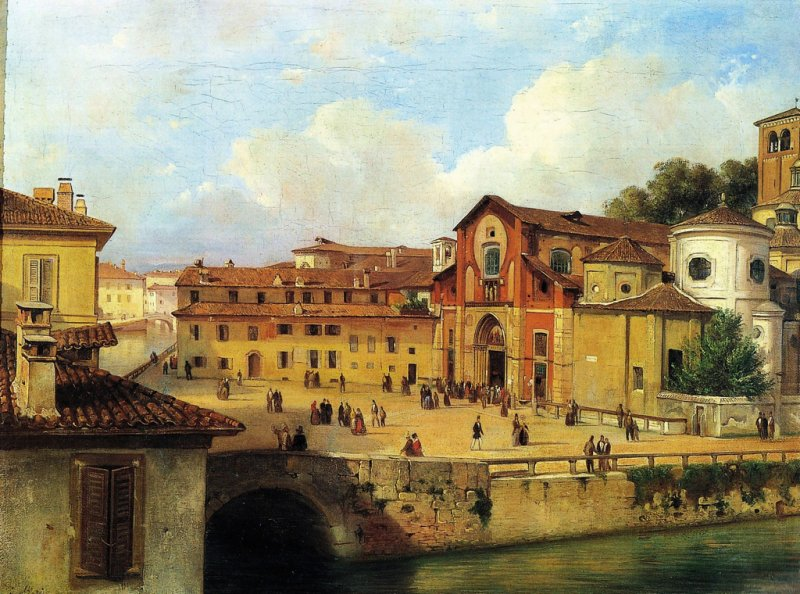
View of Facade of San Marco (1835) by Giuseppe Bisi, to the left extends the former laghetto

According to tradition, the church was dedicated to St. Mark, patron of Venice, after the help given by that city in the war against Frederick Barbarossa in the 12th century. However, the first mention of the church dates from 1254 when the Augustinians built a Gothic style edifice with a nave and two aisles re-using pre-existing constructions. The area of present Via San Marco contained a basin (artificial lake) called Laghetto di San Marco which connected to various canals (navigli); the basin was filled in the 1930s, and the area now sports a frequent outdoor market.

The structure was heavily modified in the Baroque style during the 17th century, when it became the largest church in the city after the Duomo di Milano.

In early 1770, the young Mozart resided in the monastery of San Marco for three months and, on May 22, 1874, the first anniversary of the death of the Milanese poet and novelist Alessandro Manzoni was commemorated in the church by the first performance of Verdi's Requiem, written in his honour.

Organists at the church have included Ruggier Trofeo.

== Art and architecture ==
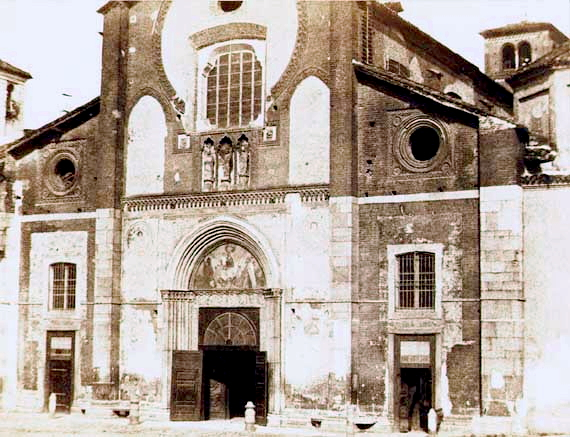
Facade prior to 1871 refurbishment.

The façade dates from an 1871 restoration by Carlo Maciachini, who kept the marble portal with tympanum, a gallery of small arches, the rose window and three statues of saints attributed to Giovanni di Balduccio or the Master of Viboldone. In the lunette is a mosaic representing the Madonna between Saints, a copy of the original by Angelo Inganni.

The campanile dates from the 14th century. It was restored and completed in 1885. The interior, in the Baroque style, has a nave and two aisles.

In the first chapel on the right are frescoes by Gian Paolo Lomazzo. In the right transept is a fresco by the Fiammenghini with Alexander IV Instituting the Order of the Augustinians, under which a 14th-century Crucifixion was discovered in 1956. The author of the latter has been identified by Anovelo da Imbonate. The right arms of the transept houses also several sarcophagi from the mid-14th century, including the tomb of Lanfranco Settalo, counsellor of Archbishop Giovanni Visconti, by Giovanni di Balduccio.

Near the rear exit is a 16th-century tombstone portraying the Angel of the Resurrection, another fresco by the Fiammenghini (under which is a 14th-century fresco). On the side walls of the presbytery are frescoes depicting Dispute of St Ambrose and St Augustine by Camillo Procaccini and the Baptism of St. Augustine by Giovanni Battista Crespi.

== Gallery ==
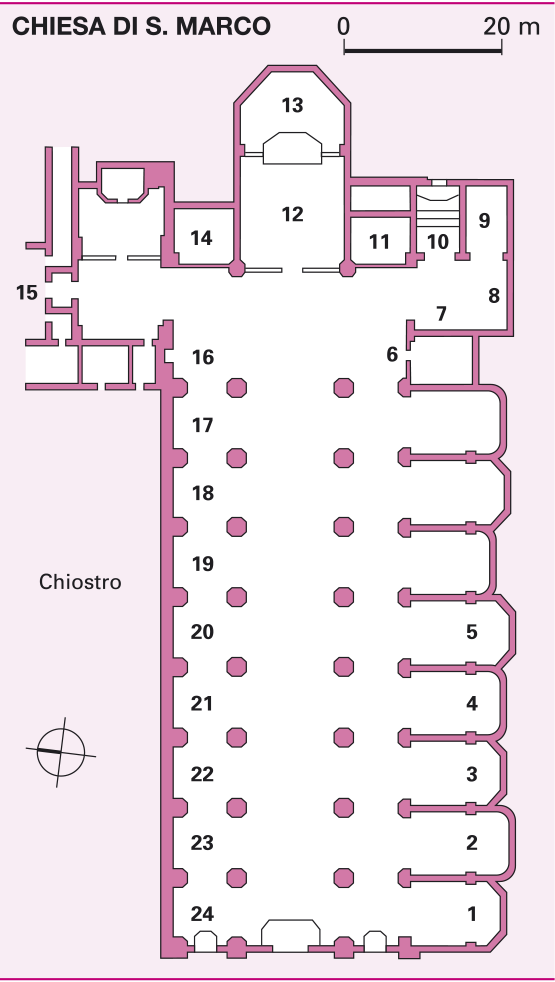
Plan of the church

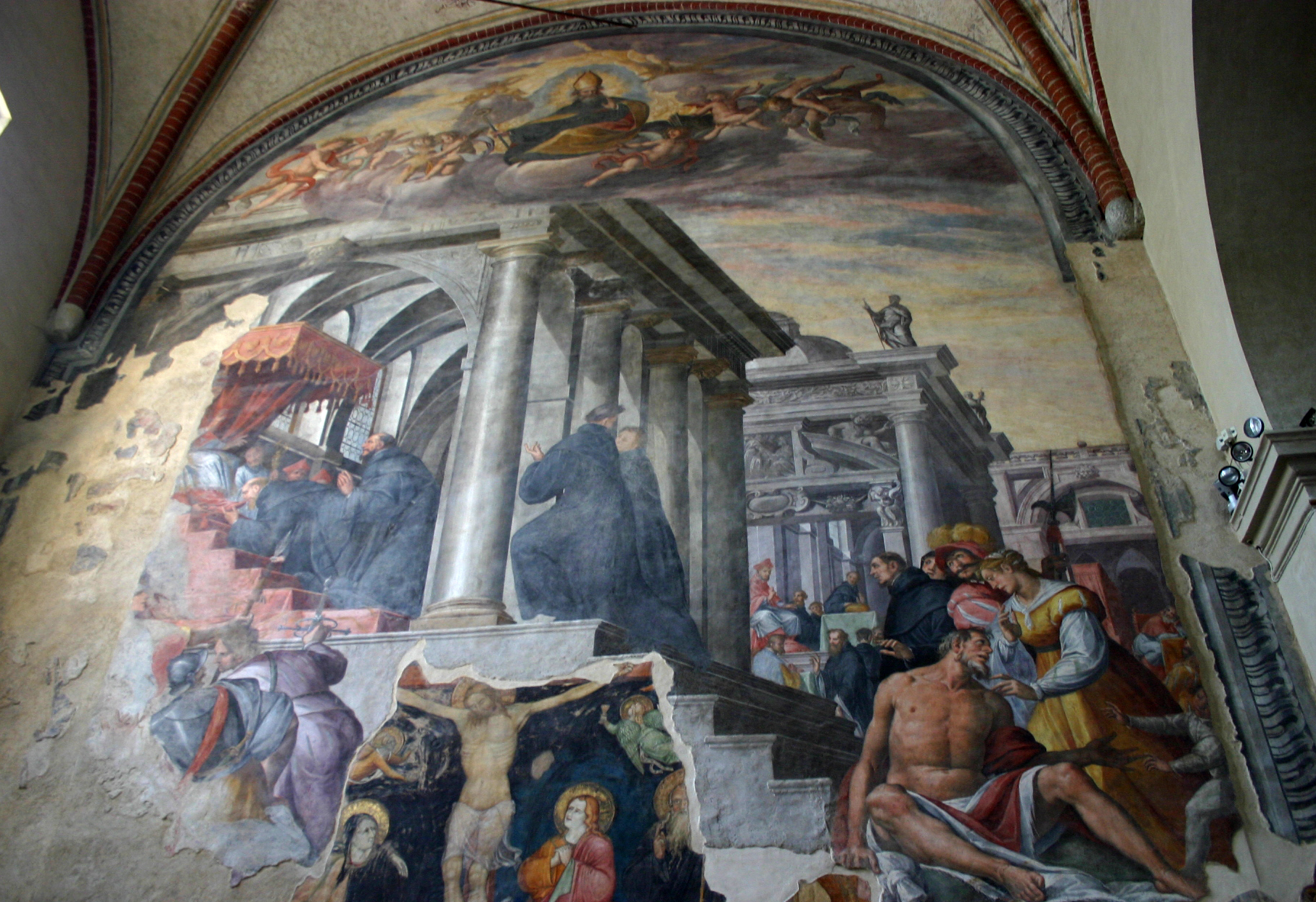
Pope Alexander IV institutes Augustinian Order (fresco) by Fiammenghini (and partially revealed older Crucifixion fresco)

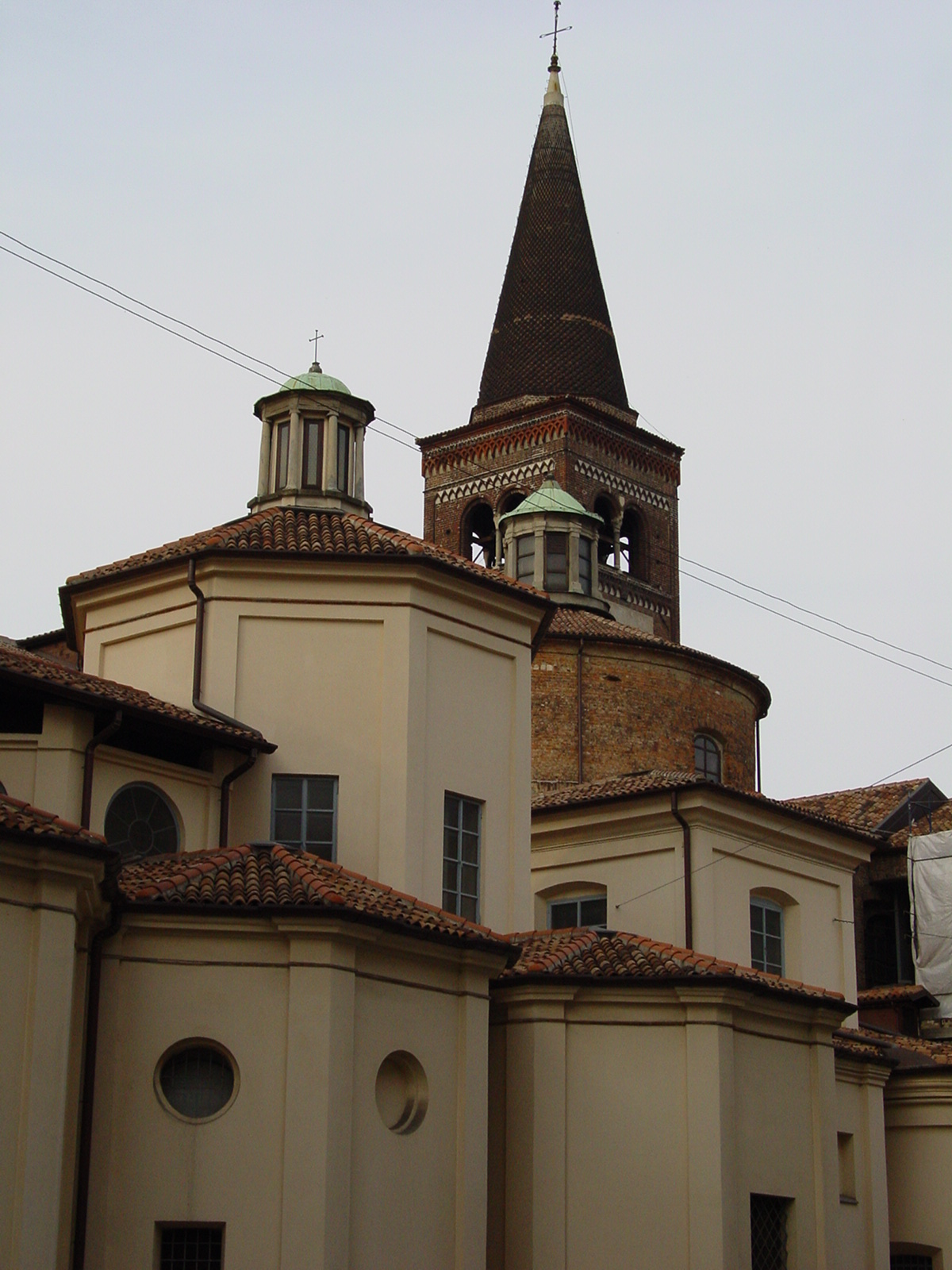
Bell tower of San Marco.

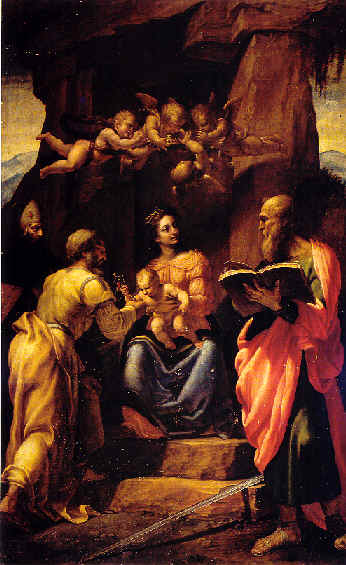
Madonna with Saints by Gian Paolo Lomazzo.

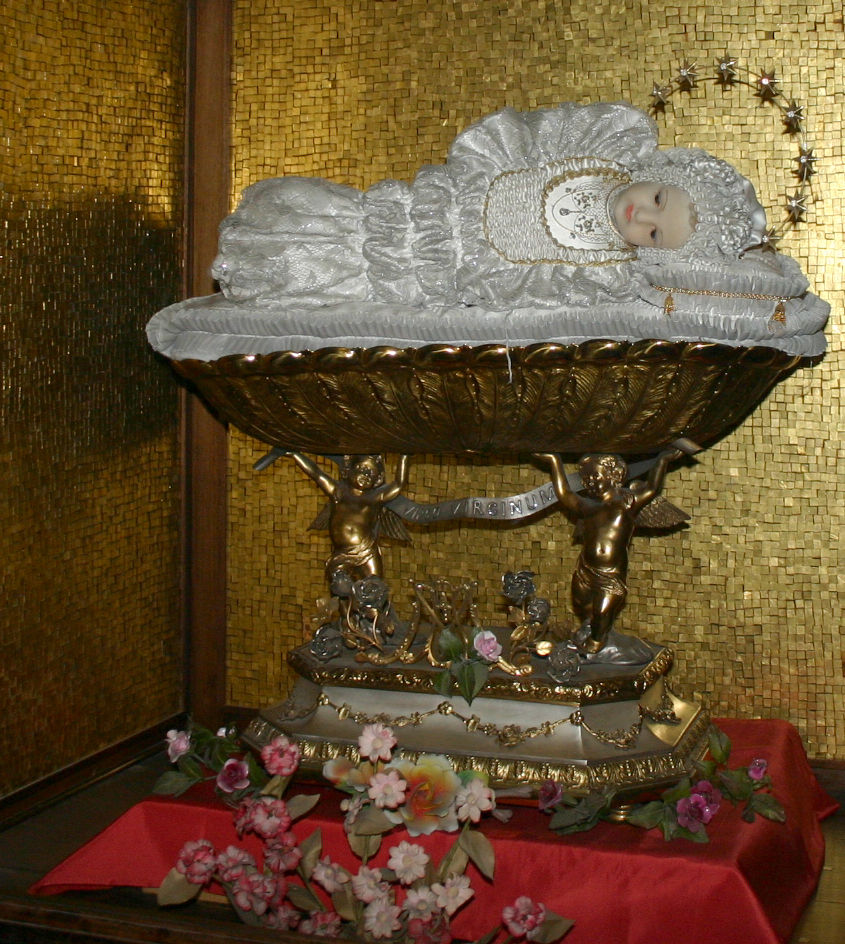
Wax statuette, in the fashion of the 19th century, of Holy Child Mary, Left transept.

== Sources ==
- Gatti Perer, M. L. (1999). La chiesa di San Marco a Milano. Milan.
