= Rossino Mantovano =

Italian composer

Rossino Mantovano (Latin: Rossinus Mantuanus "Rossino of Mantua") (fl. 1505–1511) was an Italian singer and composer.

== Life and career ==
Mantovano is known as a composer of frottole; five of which were published by Ottaviano Petrucci between 1505 and 1507. These frottole included three barzellete, an oda, and a popular text. He was employed as a male contralto at the Mantua Cathedral in 1509, and after served as the maestro di canto at that cathedral in 1510–1511. There he was responsible for training the boy sopranos. Aside from the Petrucci publications and his record of employment at the Mantua Cathedral, there is no other known information about Mantovano.

Two of Mantovano's works have maintained interest among scholars for their connections to Mantuan theatre: Poi che fai, donna, el gaton and Lirum bililirum. Poi che fai, donna, el gaton contains material that imitates the sounds of a cat's yowl. Lirum bililirum, Mantovano's most well known and most often performed work, uses text written with a Bergamasque dialect and is a parody of a serenade crooned from below a woman's window. This latter work uses bagpipes for its accompaniment rather than the traditional lute for similar works of the era. It was recorded by the King's Singers for their 1984 Madrigal History Tour album.
