= Chiesa del Cristo, Reggio Emilia =

Church in Emilia-Romagna, Italy

Coordinates: 44.6957°N 10.6296°E

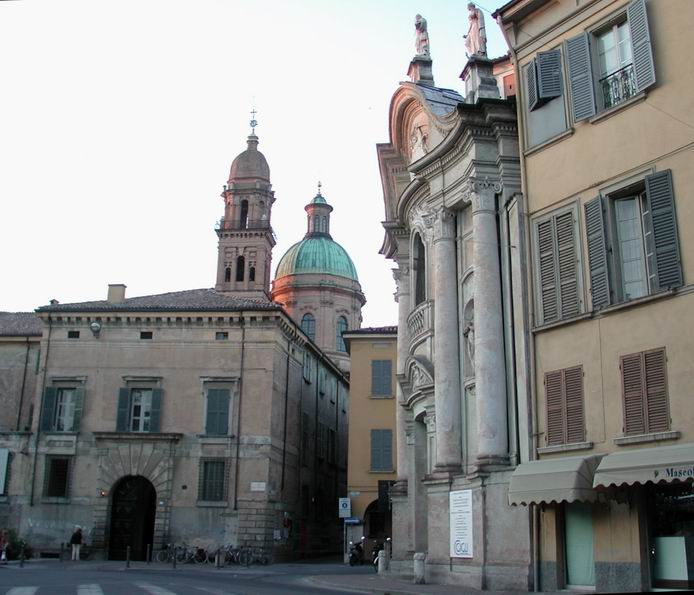
Oratorio del Cristo in Reggio Emilia

The Church of Christ (Chiesa del Cristo), also known as the Oratorio del Cristo, is a Baroque style, Roman Catholic church located on Piazzale Roversi #4 in Reggio Emilia, Italy.

== History ==
An oratory was built to shelter a fresco of a crucifix painted with oil on plaster during the plague of 1630–1631. Further construction took place from 1761 to 1763 using architectural designs by Giovanni Battista Cattani, known as Cavallari. Closed during the Napoleonic rule, it was re-opened in 1814; in the twentieth century it underwent reconstruction.

Atop the curved roofline of the façade are three marble statues depicting Faith (holding the Cross), Hope and Charity (holding the Child), by Angelo Finali (18th century). The interior is elaborately stuccoed. The altar was completed by the Tondelli studio. The anonymous fresco depicting "The Crucified Christ with the Grieving Virgin kneeling at his feet" is conserved in the apse.

The church now home to the Orthodox Rumanian congregation.
