= Ippolito Andreasi =

Italian painter

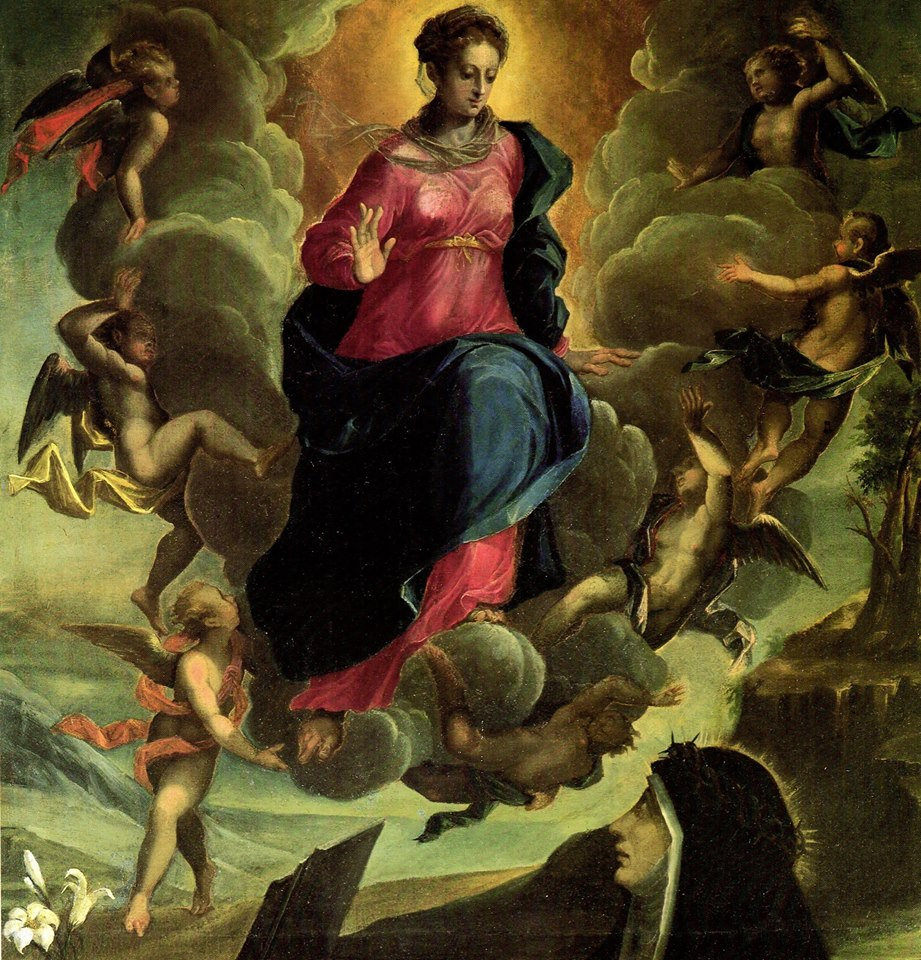
Ippolito Andreasi, The Assumption of the Blessed, c. 1575

Ippolito Andreasi (1548 – 5 June 1608) was an Italian painter of the Renaissance period. He was a pupil of Giulio Romano in his hometown of Mantua. He collaborated with Teodoro Ghisi in painting the ceiling and cupola of the cathedral.
