= Basilica palatina di Santa Barbara =

Church in Mantua, Italy

Coordinates: 45.160149°N 10.799569°E

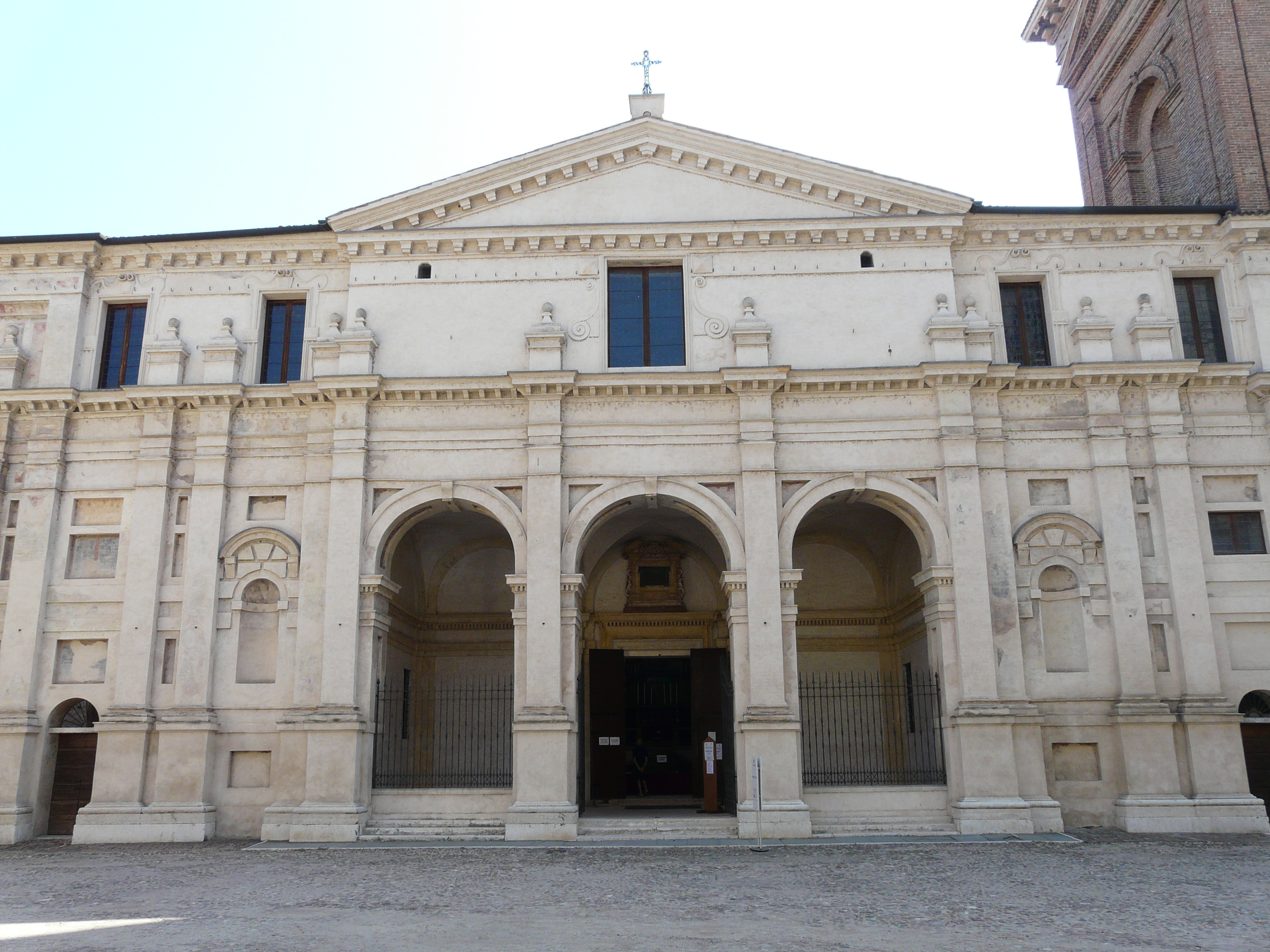
The facade

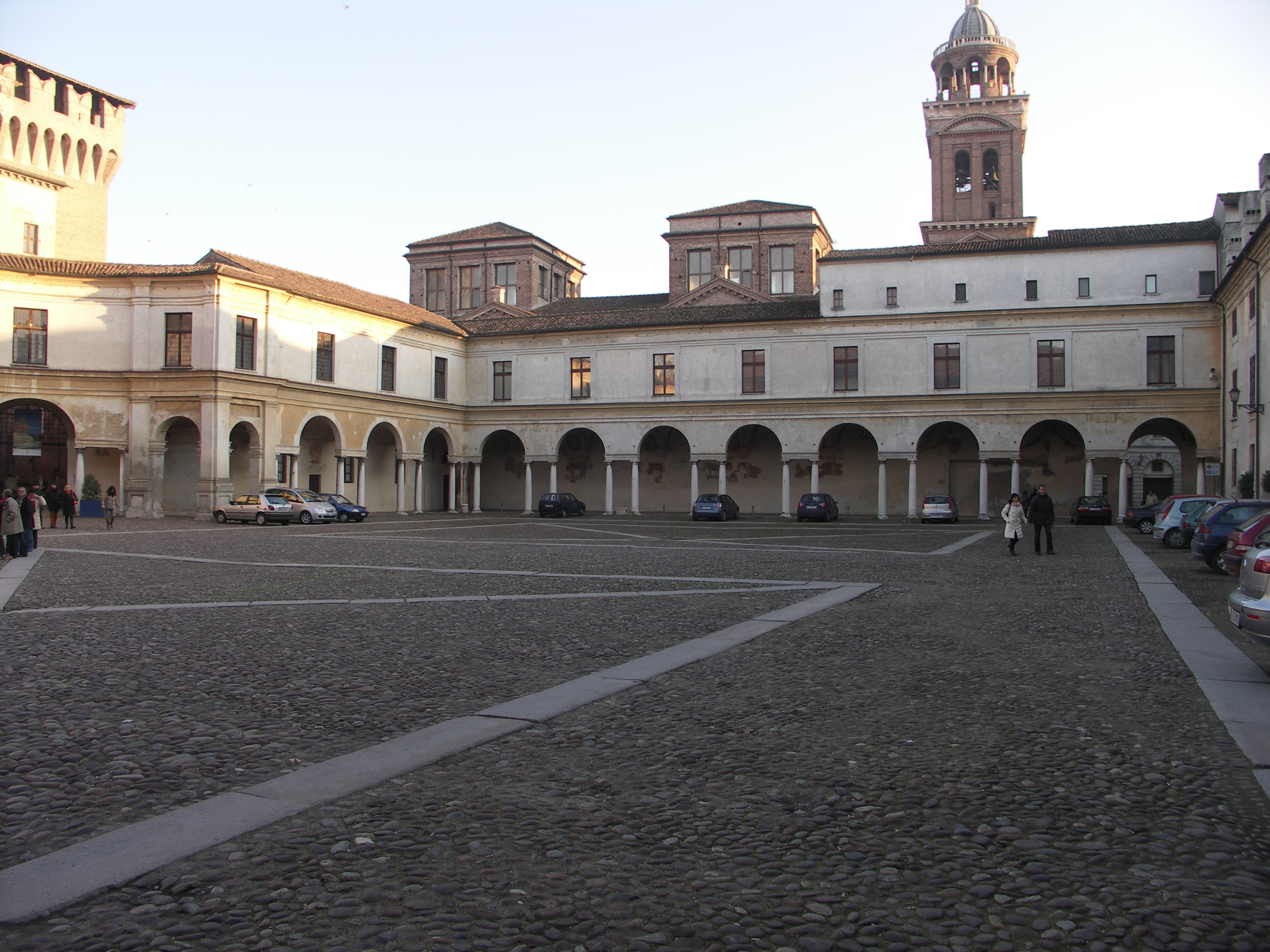
Mantua, Palazzo Ducale: the Castle Square and the Campanile of Santa Barbara

The Basilica Palatina di Santa Barbara is the Palatine Chapel of the House of Gonzaga in Mantua, Italy.

== History ==
Built at the request of the Duke Guglielmo Gonzaga and built by the Mantuan Architect Giovan Battista Bertani, the monument was erected in two phases, from 1562 to 1567 and from 1569 to 1572, and from 1565 the religious court ceremonies were led by the abbots.

The link between the Duke's Palace and the Church, desired by Duke Guglielmo, was closed at the end of the 19th century in order to separate the property of the Italian State from that of the Church because of the conflict that followed the end of the Pope's secular power in 1870. On September 16, 2018, the passage was reopened to the public.

Santa Barbara can be considered the masterpiece of both the client and the builder. It was granted numerous privileges by the Duke to remove it from the Bishop's control and to practice its own rite, which differed from the Roman Rite. It was conceived as a place of rich liturgical ceremonies, accompanied by sacred music at the highest level. The Duke took a personal interest in the organ, built by Graziadio Antegnati, which survives to this day.

The strong earthquake in Emilia on 29 May 2012 caused damage to the dome of the bell tower of the basilica.

== Description ==
The architectural structure is unique. A central structure with a square dome housing in the middle is followed by a raised presbytery, which is covered by a second dome housing similar to the first one, followed by an apsis, which is decorated with peculiar intersecting boxes. The interior is single-nave with side chapels and the adjoining semicircular presbytery. Next to the main altar, a staircase leads to a deep crypt consisting of a rectangular room and an oval shrine. The pilasters consist of simple bands without base and capital.

The brick bell tower, crowned by a small round temple, is one of the most characteristic elements of Mantua's urban landscape. The model that inspired the court architect Giovan Battista Bertani is the Tempietto di Bramante of San Pietro in Montorio by Donato Bramante, where after the visit of Sebastiano Serlio and Andrea Palladio he replaced the vitruvian beam with a Venetian window.

Inside, on the two side altars designed by Giovan Battista Bertani, there are two large paintings by Lorenzo Costa the Younger, the Baptism of Constantine and the Martyrdom of St. Hadrian. Other paintings are the altarpiece in the presbytery with the Martyrdom of Saint Barbara by Domenico Brusasorci (1564), the Annunciation on one side of the organ doors by Fermo Ghisoni and on the other side the Saints Barbara and Peter (circa 1566).

== Organ ==
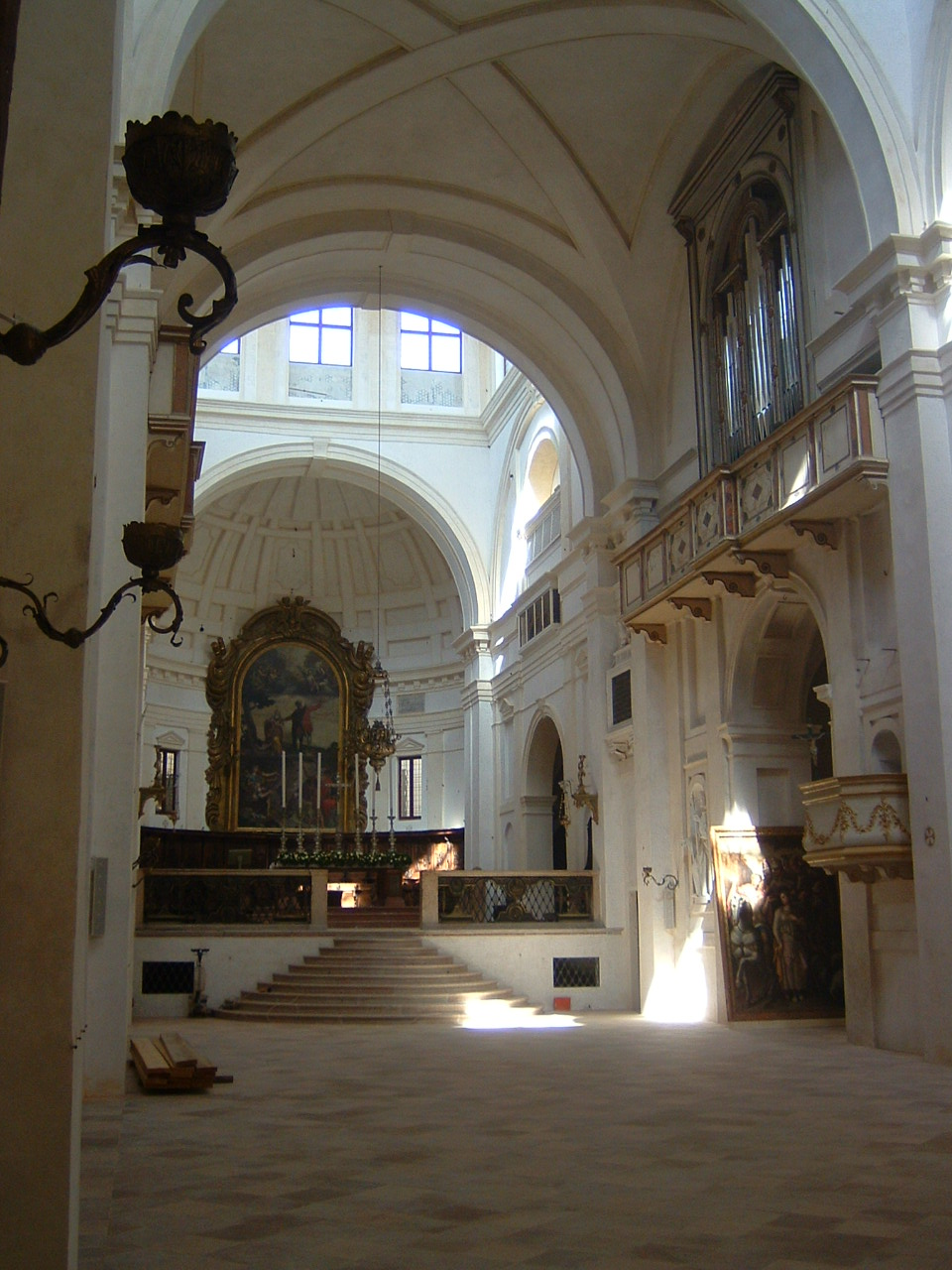
In the basilica, with the organ on the right wall.

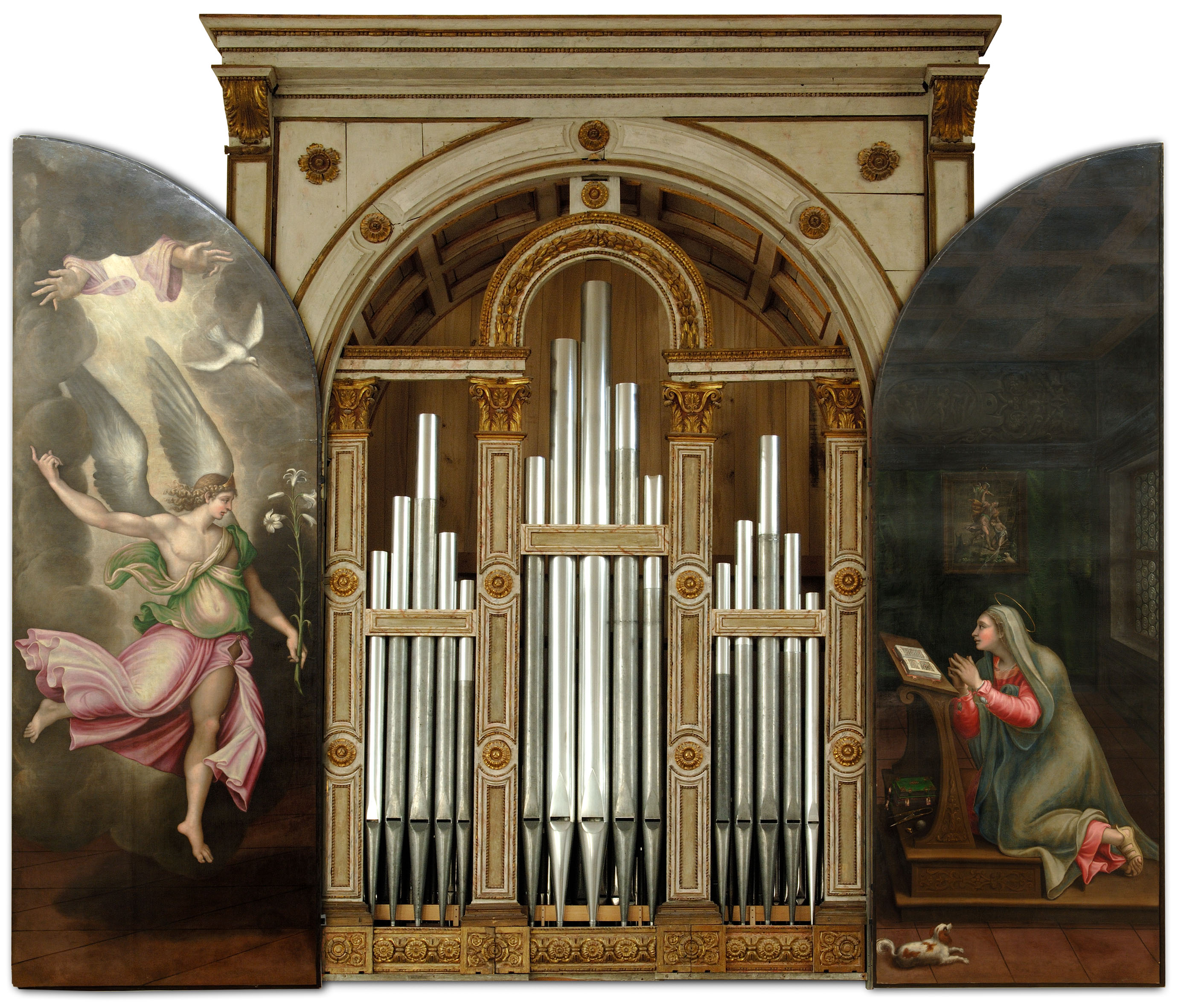
Antegnati-Organ dated 1565

In the basilica is a pipe organ built in 1565 by the organ builder Graziadio Antegnati and restored and reconstructed in the years 1995-2006 by Giorgio Carli from Pescantina. 312 pipes are preserved from the Antegnati workshop.

The instrument is equipped with a manual and a hung pedal. The manual has seven split upper keys for subsemitonics (dis/es, gis/as). The organ is housed in a richly carved, gilded Renaissance case which is placed above the choirs in the Cornu Epistulae. The prospectus can be closed by two doors attributed to Fermo Ghisoni and on the outside it shows the holy Saint Barbara and the holy Petrus, on the inside the Annunciation. The disposition is as follows:

I Manual CDEFGA–f^{3}
Principale	16′
Fiffaro	16′
Ottava	8′
Decima Quinta	4′
Decima Nona	2 2/3′
Vigesima Seconda	2′
Vigesima Sesta	1 1/3′
Vigesima Nona	1′
Trigesima Terza	2/3′
Trigesima Sesta	1/2′
Flauto in XIX	2 2/3′
Flauto in VIII	8′

Pedal CDEFGA–a^{0}

Coupled

Organists at the basilica have included Ruggier Trofeo.

== Gonzaga Pantheon ==
Important members of the Gonzaga dynasty who were found during restoration work in 2007 were buried in the Palatina Basilica:

- Federico II Gonzaga, Duke of Mantua, (first);
- Francesco III Gonzaga, Duke of Mantua, (second);
- Guglielmo Gonzaga, third duke of Mantua;
- Guglielmo Domenico, son of Vincenzo Gonzaga, Duke of Mantua;
- Francesco IV Gonzaga, Duke of Mantua;
- Charles I Gonzaga, Duke of Mantua;
- Ferdinando Carlo Gonzaga, Duke of Mantua and Montferrat, tenth Duke of Mantua (only the skull, the rest is preserved in San Francesco Grande in Padova).
