= Amanzia Guérillot =

Italian painter (1828–1905)

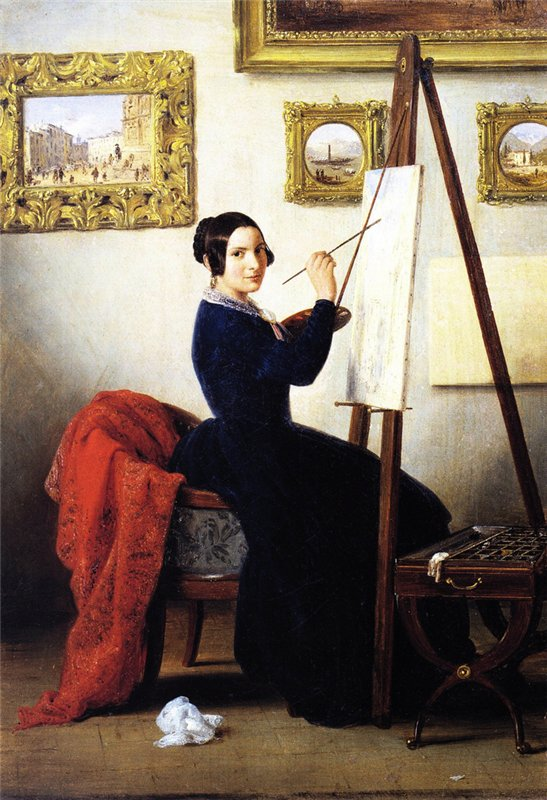
Portrait of Amanzia Guérillot in her studio (1847/1848), by Angelo Inganni

Amanzia Ammirata Guérillot (English: /ɡɛriːˈjoʊ/ gerr-ee-YOH, French: [amanzja ɡeʁijo]; 20 April 1828 – 1 December 1905) was an Italian painter of French parentage; known primarily for vedute and still-lifes. Many of her works were mistakenly attributed to her first husband, Angelo Inganni.

== Biography ==
She was born in Milan to a French emigrant family and received her first drawing lessons from her father, Nicolas, who had served as an accounting officer in the French army. In 1845, the painter Angelo Inganni became her mentor and she often served as his model. He also taught her the rudiments of oil painting, in exchange for French lessons for his niece.

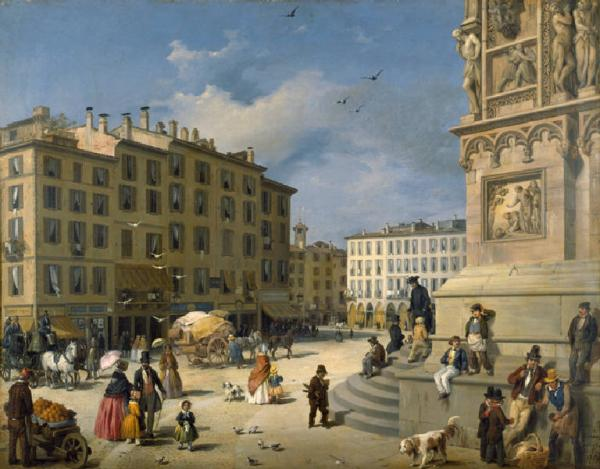
Piazza del Duomo in Milan (c.1850)

Two years later, she had her first exhibition at the Accademia di Belle Arti di Brera, presenting two vedute (the Palazzo di Giustizia in Milan and an area near Brescia known as the "Taglietto") as well as a waterscape of a steamboat on Lake Como.

Guérillot exhibited widely over the next few years, expanding her repertoire to animals, still lifes and portraits. From 1853 to 1855, she created fourteen Stations of the Cross for the parish church in Gussago.

In 1856, she married Inganni, twenty-one years her senior, whose wife had died three years earlier. After the honeymoon, they settled near Gussago and often worked as a team, until his death in 1880. In addition to their canvases they painted wooden soldiers, door panels, and decorations for mirrors, boxes and screens.

In 1887, Guérillot remarried. Her new husband was Lodovico Antoniani, a local magistrate. Shortly after, they moved to Padua and she appears to have given up painting. When she was widowed again, she returned to Lombardy to live with Inganni's niece. Guérillot died on 1 December 1905 in Boffalora sopra Ticino.
