= Pierpaolo dalle Masegne =

Italian sculptor and architect (fl. 1383–1403)

Pierpaolo dalle Masegne (fl. 1383 – 1403) was an Italian sculptor and architect, best remembered for his work on the Doge's Palace, the iconostasis of St Mark's Basilica, and the tomb of Margherita Malatesta, along with his frequent collaborations with his brother Jacobello dalle Masegne.
