= Osanna of Mantua =

Dominican mystic and stigmatic (1449–1505)

Blessed Osanna of Mantua TOSD

Virgin
- Born: 17 January 1449; Carbonara di Po; March of Mantua, Holy Roman Empire
- Died: 18 June 1505 (aged 56); Mantua, March of Mantua, Holy Roman Empire
- Venerated in: Roman Catholic Church (Dominican Order)
- Beatified: 24 November 1694, Saint Peter's Basilica, Papal States by Pope Innocent XII
- Major shrine: Mantua Cathedral
- Feast: 18 June
- Attributes: wearing a crown of thorns and surrounded by rays of light; with the devil under her feet; a broken heart with a crucifix springing from it; a lily; two angels, one with a lily, one with a cross

Osanna of Mantua (also "Hosanna") (17 January 1449 – 18 June 1505) was an Italian Dominican tertiary who gained notice as a stigmatic and mystic.

== Life ==
Osanna was the daughter of the nobles Niccolò Andreasi, whose family had originated in Hungary, and of Agnese Gonzaga. She was reported to have had a vision of angels at age six. Feeling called to consecrated life, she rejected a marriage arranged by her father. Unable to explain her attraction to religious life to her father, in 1463, at the age of 14, she secretly received the religious habit of the Third Order of St. Dominic. She had been drawn to this Order from her admiration of two members of the Order, Catherine of Siena, and her contemporary, Friar Girolamo Savonarola, who both represented to her lives of strict self-denial.

Returning home, Osanna explained that she had made a religious vow and had to wear it until she had fulfilled her promise., which is an ancient custom. She waited 37 years to complete her vows so she could care for her brothers and sisters after the death of her parents.

A legend states that Osanna, like Catherine of Siena, miraculously learned to read and write. One day, she saw a piece of paper with two words and said, "Those words are 'Jesus' and 'Mary.'" Allegedly, from that time on, anything relating to the spiritual was within her grasp.

When Osanna was thirty years old, she received the stigmata on her head, her side and her feet. She also had a vision in which her heart was transformed and divided into four parts. For the rest of her life, she actively experienced the Passion of Jesus, but especially intensely on Wednesdays and Fridays. Osanna confided these things in her biographer and "spiritual son", the Olivetan monk, Dom Jerome of Mount Olivet, as well as the fact that for years, she subsisted on practically no food at all.

Osanna was a mystic who would fall into ecstasies whenever she spoke of God, and a visionary who saw images of Christ bearing his cross. She bore stigmata along with red marks, but there was no bleeding. She helped the poor and sick and served as spiritual director for many, spending much of her family's considerable fortune to help the unfortunate. She spoke out against decadence and criticized the aristocracy for a lack of morality. She was a friend of another member of her Order, Columba of Rieti, and is recorded to have sought counsel from another, the Stephana de Quinzanis.

These phenomena brought Ossana to the attention of Mantua's ruling family. Most notably, she was sought by Francesco II Gonzaga and his wife, Isabella d'Este, as both a spiritual guide and a counsellor on matters of state. She frequently foretold correctly events which later came to pass, and gained the reputation of a seer. When she died in Mantua on 18 June 1505, all the members of the nobility and clergy attended her funeral, as her body was taken in procession to the Church of St. Dominic, where it was enshrined. Later, her remains were transferred to the Cathedral of St. Peter, where they are still venerated.

== Relationship with Girolamo de Monte Oliveto ==
Her confidant, Dom Jerome (Italian: Girolamo de Monte Oliveto), wrote a vita (biography) of her life in 1507, very shortly after her death. Although Jerome noted that Osanna was not quick to discuss her spiritual experiences, in the last years of her life, she adopted Jerome as a "spiritual son", "conceived in the Blood of Christ".

Jerome's account is especially unique due to his intimate relationship with his subject. The biography takes the form of a detailed report of his conversations with Osanna. Jerome appended to his account Latin translations of twenty-four letters from Osanna, accompanied by documents certifying their authenticity.

According to Father Benedict Ashley, these letters express an "intense and constant physical and inner suffering" made bearable only by "sublime experiences of union with God which [Osanna] cannot describe except in broken and inadequate language". A special source of misery for Osanna was the degradation of the Church under the abusive pontificate of Alexander VI.

== Veneration ==
In a response to a request by the Marchesa Isabella d'Este while on a visit to Rome, through a papal brief of 8 January 1515 Leo X authorised the celebration of her feast day in the City of Mantua. Her local cultus was confirmed by Pope Innocent XII with a Papal bull of 24 November 1694, and extended to the whole of the Dominican Order two months later.

== Works ==
The content of the literary corpus of the Blessed Osanna ranges from mystical reflection to considerations on contemporary social and political questions. Her works consist of:

- Lettere, an index of correspondence, addressed to a varied readership, including her fellow Dominicans and members of Mantua's ruling family;
- Colloqui Spirituali, or dialogues on spiritual subjects between the Blessed Osanna and Girolamo de Monte Oliveto Scolari.
