= Giovanni Angelo Finali =

Italian sculptor

Giovanni Angelo Finali (1709–1772) was an Italian sculptor, active in Northern Italy.

He was born in Valsolda in Lombardy, but left works in Reggio Emilia and Verona. He trained with a sculptor active in the court at Dresden. He completed the statuary of the Mausoleum of Sebastiano and Vincenzo Pisani in the church of Sant'Anastasia in Verona. He also completed the Statue of Scipione Maffei (1756) for the Domus Nova or Palazzo dei Giudici in Verona. He also completed the statues of the Madonna del Rosario and St Dominic for the Dominican Convent of Verona, later Royal Lyceum. He also completed marble angels of the altar of the Oratorio dei Filippini; Saints Peter and Paul for the facade of the church of San Paolo in Campo Marzio. He also completed some of the statuary outside the Cathedral of Mantua. He created statues for the church of Chiesa del Cristo, Reggio Emilia. He died in Breslau. Among his pupils was Giovanni Paolo Devere.
