= Teodoro Ghisi =

Italian painter

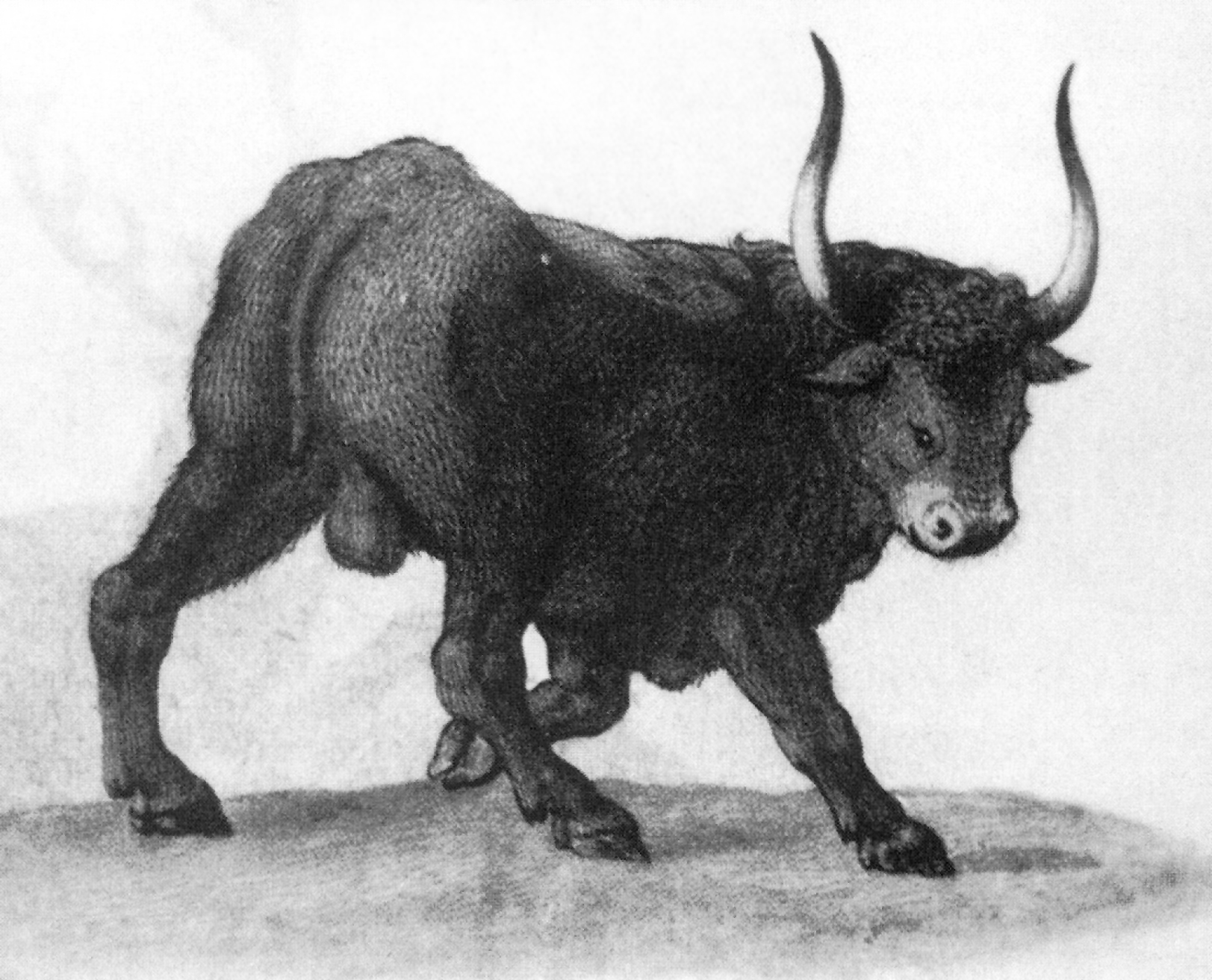
Aurochs as Ghisi believed it to be, though significant features differ

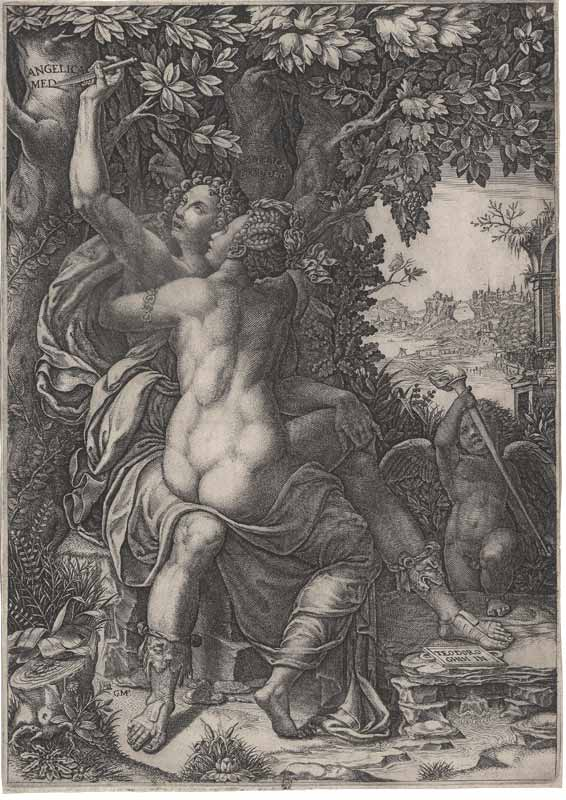
Engraving by Giorgio Ghisi, based on drawing by his brother Teodoro Ghisi, Angelica and Medoro, 1570

Teodoro Ghisi (1536–1601) was an Italian painter and engraver of the Renaissance Period, mainly active in his native Mantua. He specialized in paintings of animal and nature scenes.

Teodoro was known mostly for his drawings and illustration of animals. His brother Giorgio Ghisi, was a well-known engraver. Teodoro was a custodian of the Duchal summer house known as the Palazzo del Te in Mantua. The Duke's extensive natural history collection attracted a visit in 1571 from Ulisse Aldrovandi, for whom he executed some animal paintings, including those of two parrots. At around the same time he created the designs for Giorgio's engravings of Venus and Adonis and Angelica and Medoro. In 1576 he and Giorgio acquired a house in Mantua, where Teodoro worked for Dukes Guglielmo Gonzaga and Vincenzo I. Between 1579 and 1581 he contributed to the decoration of the Galleria dei Mesi in the Palazzo Ducale and probably worked with Lorenzo Costa the younger in the Sala dello Zodiaco there.

Around 1579 he executed a Visitation for the cathedral at Carpi, and in 1586-7 he worked in the Palazzo di Goito (destr.). From 1587 to 1590 he was court painter to Guglielmo Gonzaga's brother-in-law Archduke Charles II of Austria (1564–90), in Seckau and Graz, where he painted the altarpiece Symbolum apostolorum (1588; Graz, Alte Gallery), showing the creation of Eve surrounded by depictions of articles of the Nicene Creed. He received a life pension from the Archduke in 1589 but returned to Mantua in 1590.

There, he and Ippolito Andreasi decorated the cathedral for Bishop Francesco Gonzaga, with frescos that accorded with the dictates of the Counter-Reformation. The evangelists' animal symbols attest to Teodoro's continuing interest in nature. He indulged this further in his illustrations for Pietro Candido Decembrio's De animantium naturis. In general his work is more realistic than imaginative.
