= Holy Family (disambiguation) =

Holy Family is a Christian term for Jesus, the Virgin Mary and St. Joseph.

Holy Family may also refer to:

== Book ==
- The Holy Family (book), by Karl Marx and Friedrich Engels written in 1844

== Art ==
- The Holy Family with the Dragonfly, a 1495 engraving by German artist Albrecht Dürer
- Holy Family and donors (Carpaccio), a 1505 painting by Italian artist Vittore Carpaccio
- Doni Tondo, a circa 1507 (probably between 1503 and 1508) painting by Michelangelo
- Canigiani Holy Family, a 1508 painting by Italian artist Raphael
- Holy family and Saints (Pontormo), a 1516 painting by Italian artist Jacopo Pontormo
- Holy Family with Saint John the Baptist and Saint Catherine, a. c. 1520–1528 painting by Palma Vecchio and Titian
- Holy Family (Andrea del Sarto), a 1529 painting by Italian artist Andrea Sarto
- The Holy Family with Saint John the Baptist and an Angel, a c. 1535–1540 oil on panel painting by Il Sodoma
- The Holy Family with Saint John the Baptist, a c. 1550–1560 oil on panel painting by Nosadella
- Holy Family (Costa), a 16th-century painting by Italian artist Lorenzo Costa
- Holy Family (El Greco, Museo de Santa Cruz), a 1588 painting by Greek artist El Greco
- Holy Family (El Greco, Hospital de Tavera), a 1595 painting by Greek artist El Greco
- The Holy Family (Doxaras), a 1700 painting by Greek artist Panagiotis Doxaras
- The Holy Family (Collinson painting), an 1878 painting by British artist James Collinson

== Film and television ==
- The Holy Family (film), a 2006 television drama film
- Holy Family (TV series), a 2022 television series

== Religious buildings ==
- Holy Family Cathedral (disambiguation)
- Holy Family Church (disambiguation)
- Holy Family Shrine

== Educational institutions ==
- Holy Family Catholic High School (disambiguation)
- Holy Family High School (disambiguation)
- Holy Family School (disambiguation)

=== Philippines ===
- Holy Family Academy (Philippines), a K-12 school in Angeles City

=== United Kingdom ===
- Holy Family Catholic Academy, a secondary school in Cleethorpes, Lincolnshire, England, now Beacon Academy, Cleethorpes
- Holy Family Roman Catholic and Church of England College, a secondary school in Heywood, Greater Manchester, England

=== United States ===
- Holy Family Academy (New Hampshire), a junior/ senior high school in Manchester
- Holy Family Academy (Bayonne, New Jersey), a high school
- Holy Family University, Pennsylvania, near Philadelphia
