= Holy Family School =

Holy Family School may refer to:

- Holy Family School (Seattle, Washington) in Seattle, Washington
- Holy Family School (Port Allen) in Port Allen, Louisiana
- Holy Family Catholic School, West Yorkshire (England)

== See also ==
- Holy Family High School (disambiguation)
- Holy Family Catholic High School (disambiguation)
- Holy Family (disambiguation)
