= Parafield =

Parafield may refer to:

A suburb of Adelaide, South Australia:

- Parafield, South Australia
- Parafield Gardens, South Australia

A railway station in Adelaide, South Australia:

- Parafield railway station
- Parafield Gardens railway station

An airport in Adelaide, South Australia:

- Parafield Airport
