= Palazzo San Sebastiano =

Coordinates: 45°09′01″N 10°47′13″E

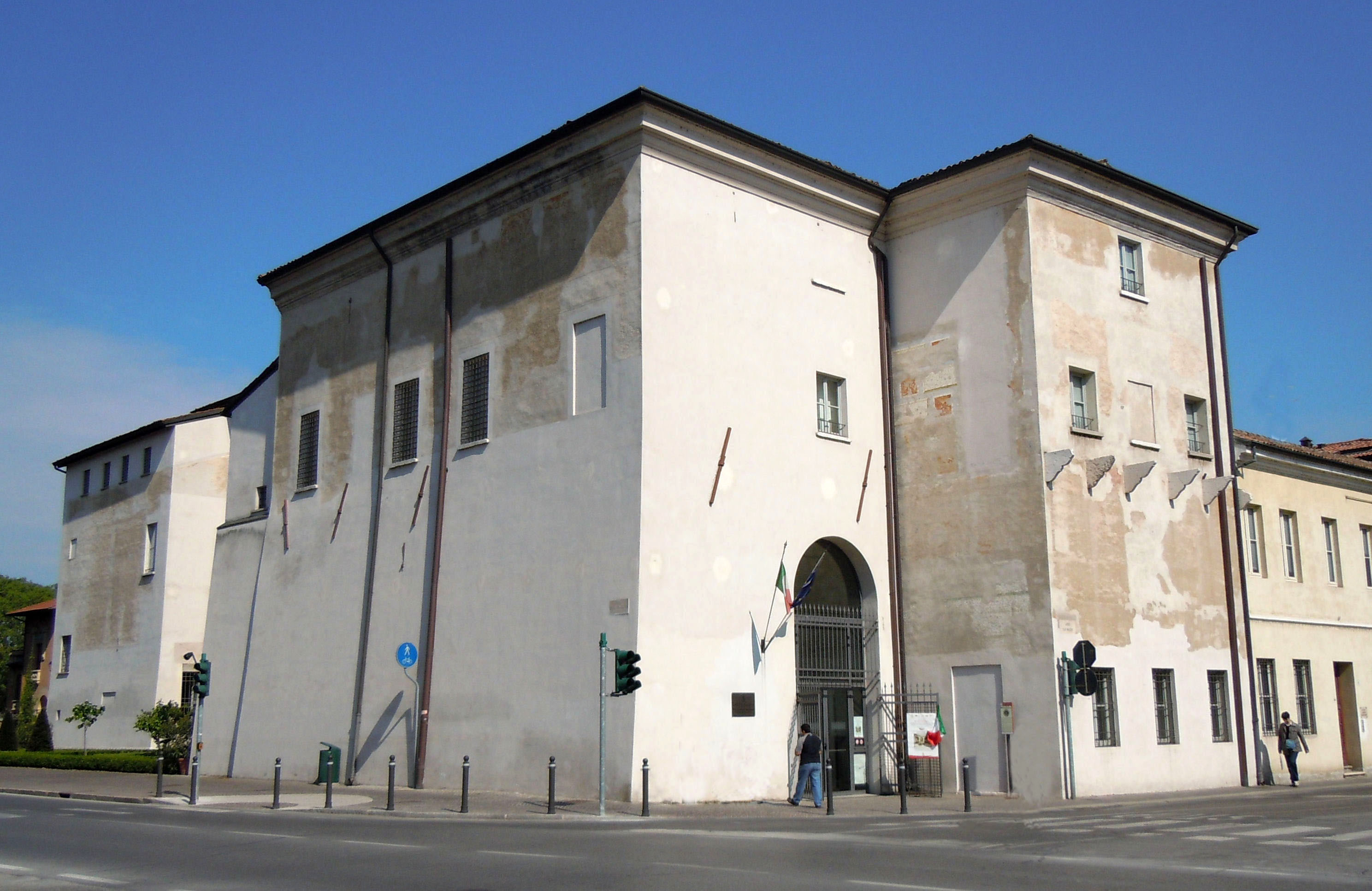
- The Palazzo San Sebastiano in Mantua
- Established: 19 March 2005 (as Museo della Città)
- Location: Mantua, Italy
- Type: City museum, historical palace

The Palazzo San Sebastiano is a 16th-century palace in Mantua. Built by the Gonzaga family, since 19 March 2005 it has housed Mantua's city museum (Museo della Città di Palazzo San Sebastiano).

== History ==
The building was constructed between 1506 and 1508 by Francesco II Gonzaga and became his favourite residence until his death in 1519. It was designed by Gerolamo Arcari and Bernardino Ghisolfo, who also commissioned artists such as Lorenzo Leonbruno, Matteo Costa and Lorenzo Costa the Elder to decorate the interior. The Palazzo's main hall was also the original setting for Mantegna's Triumphs of Caesar, now at Hampton Court near London.

After 1519 the Palazzo lost its prime position among the Gonzaga palaces, with its most valuable furniture and paintings moved elsewhere, and it was used by the Gonzaga di Novellara, Gazzuolo and Castiglione delle Stiviere branches of the family. It was in this Palazzo that Aloysius Gonzaga (a future saint) ceded his inheritance to his younger brother Rodolfo. The building was then forgotten until the mid 18th century, when it became a storehouse and barracks for the Austrian government. This usage accelerated the damage to and decay of the original structure, with the frescoes almost completely disappearing, especially when the building was used as a hospital in 1883. It was restored in the 20th century and became a public baths, an elephant colony, schools, storerooms and recreational societies.

Another restoration from 1999 to 2003 aimed wherever possible to restore the building to its original scheme and at least partially to recover the interior and exterior wall paintings and decoration. It allowed the fragments of external fresco to be stabilised and recovered, showing them to be typical of Mantuan buildings from 1550 to 1600. In 2003 the Loggia dei marmi and cycle of frescoes in the Camera del Crogiuolo, Camera delle Frecce and Camera del Sole were all opened to the public. The 2012 Northern Italy earthquakes damaged some rooms in the Palazzo.

== Museum ==
The Museum was founded in the 19th century as the Museo Patrio. It is displayed in seven thematic sections:

- The city and water - Ground floor, Loggia dei marmi
- Emblems of Kindness - Ground floor, Sala del Porcospino and Sala del Crogiolo
- City of Princes - Ground floor, Sala dei Trionfi
- The Cult of Antiquity - First floor, Camera de' Brevi
- The Rebirth of Antiquity - Mantua as Rome - First floor, Sala delle Frecce
- Mantegna's Triumphs of Caesar - First floor, Sala Est
- Examples of Mantuan painting from the 15th and 16th centuries - Second floor, Galleria Superiore

The works displayed included:

- School of Andrea Mantegna, Occasio e Poenitentia (c 1500)
- Antonio da Pavia, Madonna and Child with Saints Jerome, Albert, Angelo and Peter (oil on canvas, 1500)
- attributed to Giovanni Cristoforo Romano, Bust of Francesco II Gonzaga, (terracotta, c 1498-1500)

=== Risorgimento section ===
The Museo del Risorgimento di Mantova was inaugurated on 3 March 1903, the fiftieth anniversary of the death of the Belfiore martyrs. It was based in several different locations until in 2005, with no base of its own, its collections were formally merged into that of the City Museum. The weapons, uniforms, newspapers, manifestoes, paintings and stamps in the Risorgimento collection date from the Napoleonic era until the Third Italian War of Independence, after which Mantua was annexed to the Kingdom of Italy. The display deals with Mantua's part in the Risorgimento and consists of five sections - the Napoleonic era; the Restoration and the Revolutions of 1848; the Belfiore conspiracy; the period between the Second and Third Wars of Independence.
