= Lorenzo Costa the Younger =

Italian painter

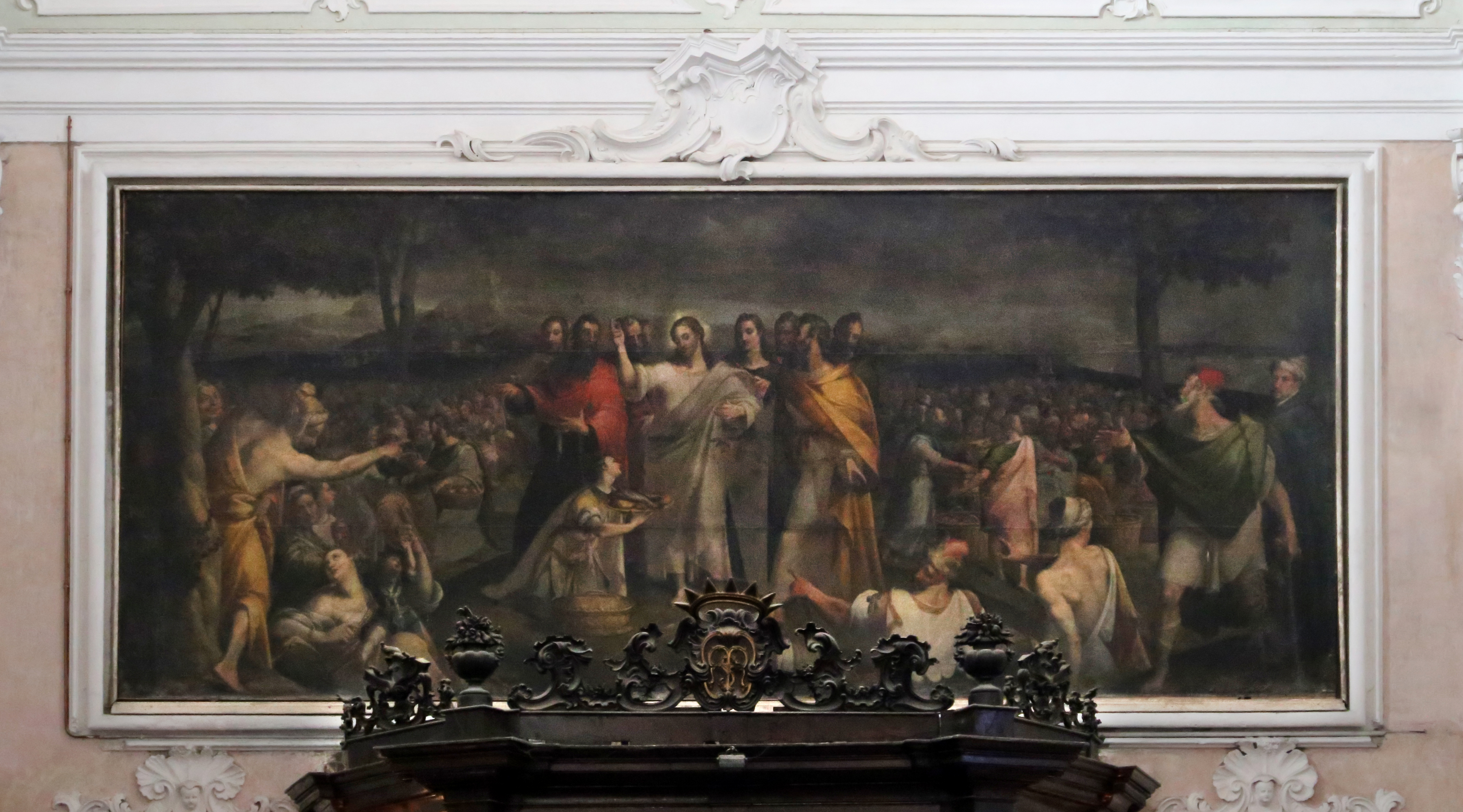
Multiplication of Loaves and Fish

Lorenzo Costa the Younger (1537–1583) was an Italian painter of the Renaissance period, active in his native city of Mantua.

Lorenzo was the son of Girolamo Costa and grandson of Lorenzo Costa, and was instructed in the art of painting by his uncle Ippolito. Around 1560, worked in concert with Taddeo Zuccaro in the Belvedere and the Casino of Pope Pius IV at Rome, and died in Mantua in 1583.

Returning to Mantua, he frescoed in the Sala dello Zodiaco in the Ducal Palace. He painted two large altarpieces for Santa Barbara church in the Ducal palace.
