= Holy Family Catholic School =

Holy Family Catholic School may refer to:

In Australia:

- Holy Family Catholic School (South Australia)

In the United Kingdom:

- Holy Family Catholic School, Keighley
- Holy Family Catholic School, Walthamstow

In the United States:

- Holy Family Catholic Schools System in Dubuque, Iowa
- Holy Family Catholic School (Austin, Texas)

== See also ==
- Holy Family Catholic High School (disambiguation)
