= HFHS =

HFHS may refer to:

- Hales Franciscan High School, Chicago, Illinois, United States
- Henry Ford Health System, Detroit, Michigan, United States
- Henry Ford High School (Detroit, Michigan), United States
- Holy Family High School (disambiguation)
