= The Holy Family with Saint John the Baptist =

16th century painting by Giovanni Francesco Bezzi

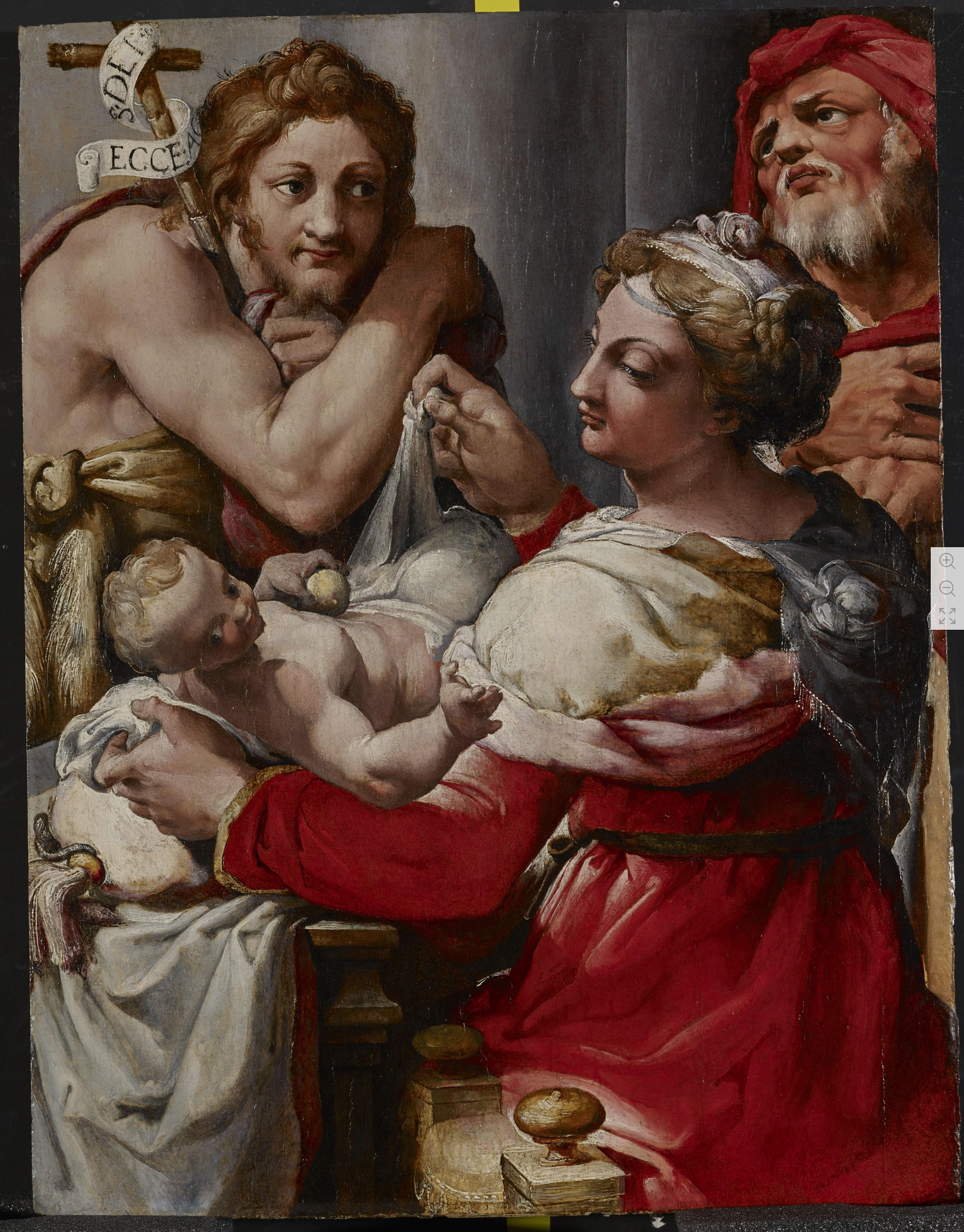
- Artist: Nosadella
- Year: ca. 1550-1560
- Type: Oil on panel
- Dimensions: 50 cm × 38 cm (19.5 in × 15 in)
- Location: Indianapolis Museum of Art, Indianapolis

The Holy Family with Saint John the Baptist is an oil painting by Italian artist Giovanni Francesco Bezzi, also known as Nosadella, located in the Indianapolis Museum of Art, which is in Indianapolis, Indiana. Painted roughly 1550-1560, it depicts Jesus, Mary, Joseph, and John in a powerful, Mannerist style.

== Description ==
This depiction of the Holy Family plus St. John has many Mannerist traits: vibrant colors, exaggerated monumentality, formal complexity, and awkward composition. The figures are all massive and muscular (particularly evident in St. John's arm), then crammed together for a composition which is highly expressive, if somewhat uncomfortable. Nosadella's Mannerist disregard for the sweetness and naturalism of earlier painters is particularly evident in the figures of Mary and Jesus. In a departure from the usual handling of this scene, Mary turns her back on the viewer rather than presenting the infant, who restlessly reaches back. This posture displays the torturous knot and bright colors on her dress, very Mannerist details. In comparison, Joseph and John have very contemplative, introverted postures considering their muscularity.

== Historical information ==
For years, the attribution of this painting shifted between Nosadella and his master Pellegrino Tibaldi, as is the case with many of their works. However, while Pellegrino's works are more fluid, Nosadella gave his figures a great deal of energy and a certain tortured physicality. Thus, this work is now confidently attributed to the student, not the teacher.

=== Acquisition ===
The IMA acquired The Holy Family with Saint John the Baptist in 1966, courtesy of the Martha Delzell Memorial Fund. It currently hangs in the Medieval Renaissance gallery and has the accession number 66.233.

== See also ==
- Canigiani Holy Family (Raphael)
