= Holy Family Cathedral =

Holy Family Cathedral, Cathedral of the Holy Family, or other variations on the name, may refer to:

== Antigua and Barbuda ==
- Holy Family Cathedral (St. John's)

== Canada ==
- Holy Family Cathedral (Saskatoon)

== Indonesia ==
- Holy Family Cathedral, Banjarmasin

== Kenya ==
- Cathedral Basilica of the Holy Family, Nairobi

== Kuwait ==
- Holy Family Cathedral, Kuwait City

== Poland ==
- Cathedral Basilica of the Holy Family, Częstochowa

== South Sudan ==
- Holy Family Cathedral, Rumbek

== United Kingdom ==
- Ukrainian Catholic Cathedral of the Holy Family in Exile, London

== United States ==
- Holy Family Old Cathedral (Anchorage, Alaska)
- Cathedral of the Holy Family (Tafuna, American Samoa)
- Holy Family Cathedral (Orange, California)
- Holy Family Cathedral (Tulsa, Oklahoma)

== See also ==
- Holy Family (disambiguation)
- Holy Family Church (disambiguation)
