= Holy Family Catholic High School =

Holy Family Catholic High School may refer to:

- Holy Family Catholic High School, Carlton, a secondary school in Carlton, North Yorkshire, England
- Holy Family Catholic High School (Minnesota), a high school in Victoria, Minnesota, United States
- Holy Family Catholic High School, Thornton, a secondary school in Thornton, Merseyside, England

== See also ==
- Holy Family Catholic School (disambiguation)
- Holy Family High School (disambiguation)
- Holy Family School (disambiguation)
- Holy family (disambiguation)
