= Green Fields, South Australia =

Suburb of Adelaide, South Australia

Greenfields
- Suburb
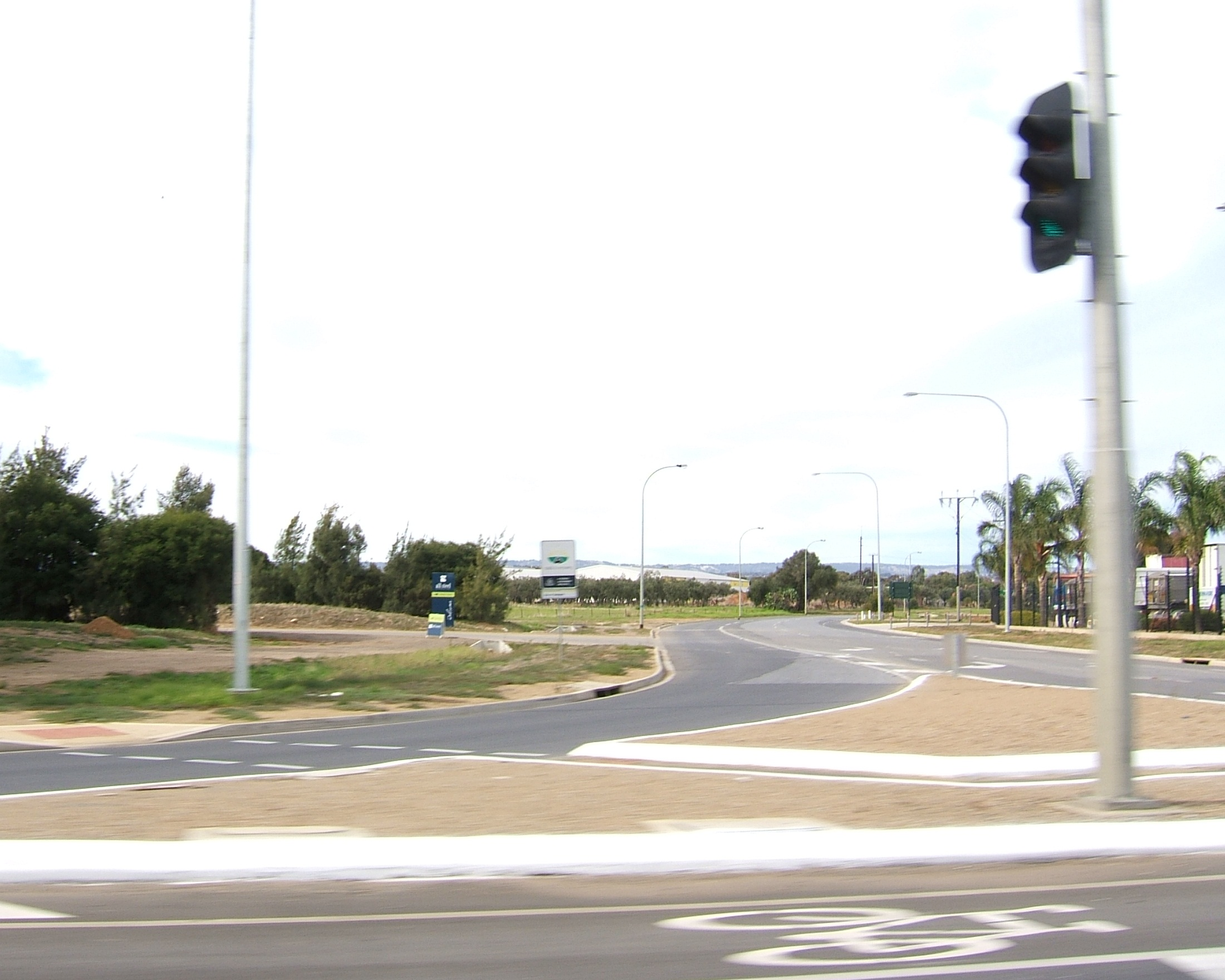
- Ryans Road, Green Fields

- Country: Australia
- State: South Australia
- City: Adelaide
- LGA: City of Salisbury

Population
  - Total: 170 (SAL 2021)
- Time zone: UTC+9:30 (ACST)
  - Summer (DST): UTC+10:30 (ACST)
- Postcode: 5107

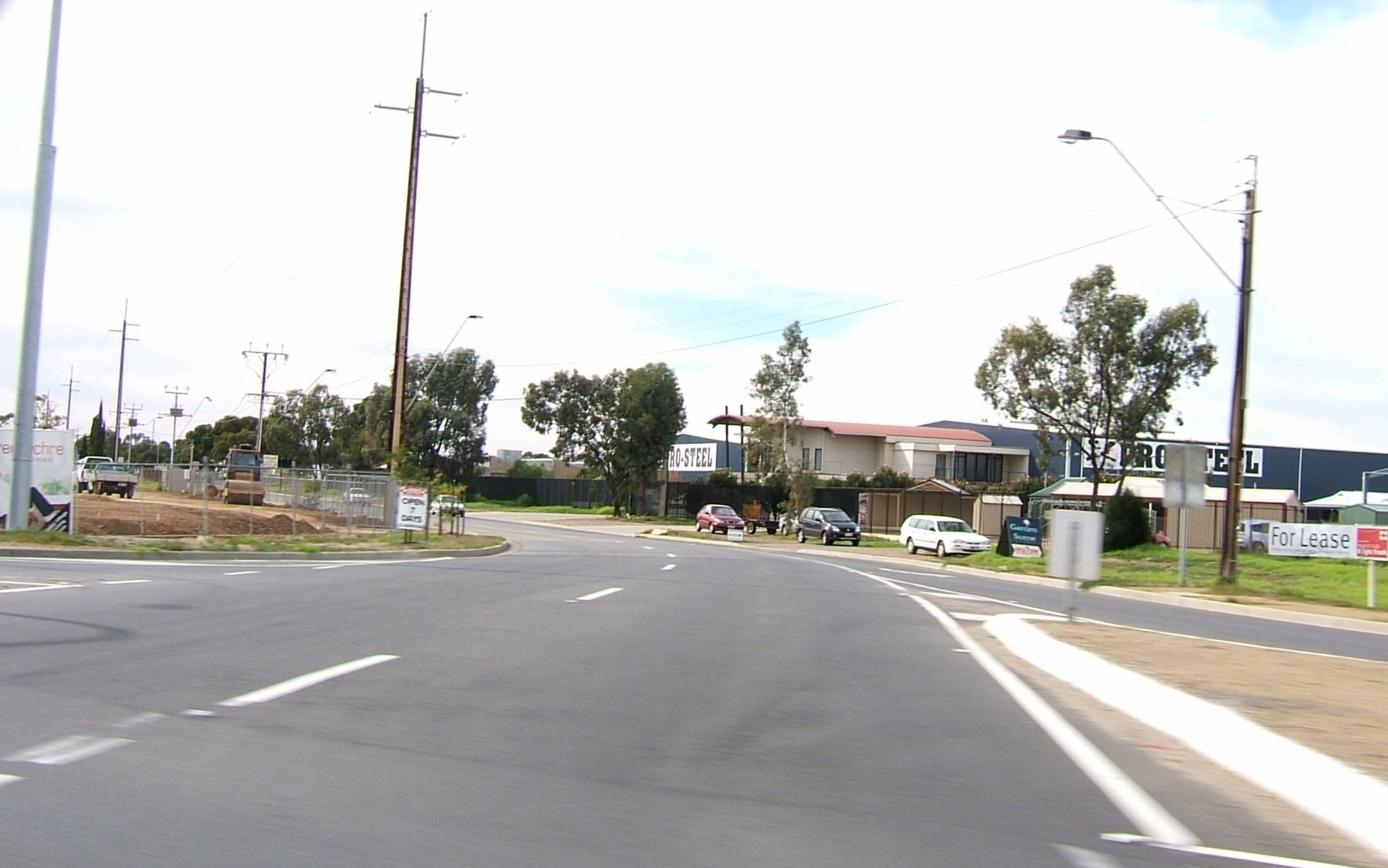
Martins Road

Green Fields is a suburb of Adelaide, the capital of South Australia. It is around 13 km north of the city centre, and mostly consists of industrial warehouses and light industry.

== Transport ==
It is served by Greenfields railway station on the Gawler railway line which is located adjacent to Parafield Airport. It is located 15.5 km by railway from the Adelaide railway station. The station was opened in 1969 and was originally referred to as 'Green Fields' in passenger timetables. Greenfields is one of only two stations on the Gawler line to have a pedestrian underpass (the other is Parafield Gardens). The other stations have had theirs closed due to concerns with safety and vandalism.
