= Occasio and Poenitentia =

Fresco by Andrea Mantegna or his school

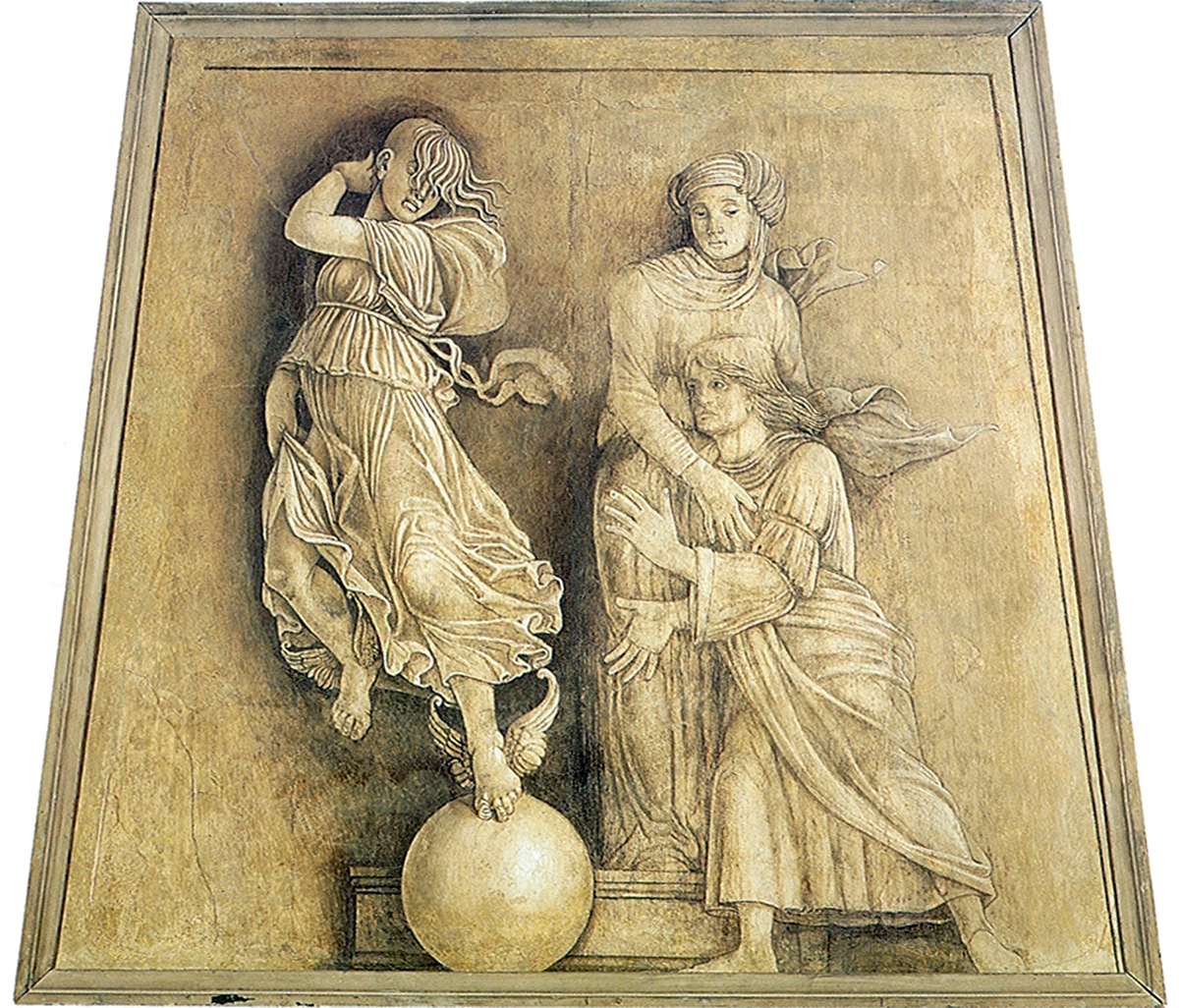

Occasio and Poenitentia is a c.1500 grisaille fresco by Andrea Mantegna or his school. It is now displayed in the Palazzo San Sebastiano in Mantua after a long period over a fireplace in the Palazzo Cavriani. It was on display in Mantua's Palazzo Ducale from 1915 to 2002.

== Bibliography ==
- (in Italian) Mauro Lucco (a cura di), Mantegna a Mantova 1460–1506, catalogo della mostra, Skira Milano, 2006
- (in Italian) Matilde Battistini, Simboli e allegorie, Electa, Verona 2007 ISBN 978-88-435-8174-0
