= Parafield Gardens railway station =

Railway station in Adelaide, South Australia

Parafield Gardens
- North-east bound view, August 2026

General information
- Location: Lindwall Street, Parafield Gardens
- Coordinates: 34°47′28″S 138°37′25″E
- Owner: Department for Infrastructure & Transport
- Operator: Adelaide Metro
- Line: Gawler
- Distance: 16.6 km from Adelaide
- Platforms: 2 (island platform)
- Tracks: 2
- Connections: None

Construction
- Structure type: Ground
- Parking: Yes
- Cycle facilities: No
- Accessible: Yes

Other information
- Station code: 16555 (to City); 18545 (to Gawler Central)
- Website: Adelaide Metro

History
- Opened: 1 May 1968

Services
Preceding station	Adelaide Metro	Following station
Greenfields towards Adelaide	Gawler line	Parafield towards Gawler Central
Location

Parafield Gardens railway station is located on the Gawler line. Situated adjacent to Parafield Airport, in the northern Adelaide suburb of Parafield Gardens, it is 16.6 kilometres (10.3 mi) from Adelaide station. This station is also frequented by Trainspotters.

== History ==
Parafield Gardens was first opened on 1 May 1968.

It is one of only two stations on the Gawler Central line to have a pedestrian underpass (the other is Greenfields). The other stations have had theirs closed due to concerns with safety and vandalism. To the west of the station lies the Australian Rail Track Corporation standard gauge line to Crystal Brook.

== Platforms and Services ==
Parafield Gardens an island platform, and is serviced by Adelaide Metro Gawler line services. Trains are scheduled every 30 minutes, seven days a week. The main entrance to the station is via a pedestrian underpass at the Northern end of the platform.

Platform	Destination
1	Gawler and Gawler Central
2	Adelaide
