= Lorenzo Leonbruno =

Italian painter

- Born: 10 March 1489; Mantua, Italy
- Died: 1537 (aged 47–48); Mantua, Italy
- Known for: Painting
- Notable work: Adoration of the Shepherds
- Movement: Early Renaissance
- Patrons: Gonzaga Family

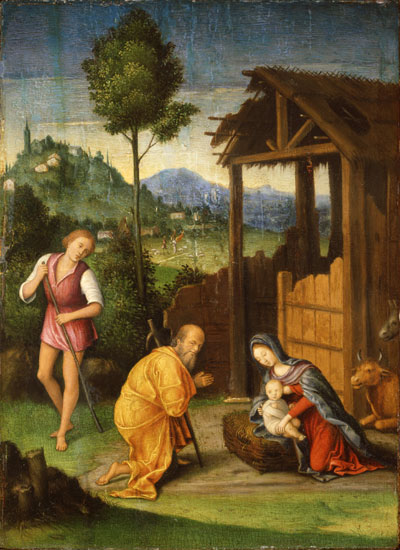
Lorenzo Leonbruno. 1505. Adoration of the Shepherds, Worcester Art Museum

Lorenzo Leonbruno (10 March 1489 – 1537), also known as Lorenzo de Leombeni, was an Italian painter during the early Renaissance period. He was born in Mantua (Mantova), an Italian commune in Lombardy, Italy. Leonbruno is most well known for being commissioned by the court of Francesco Gonzaga, Marquis of Mantua, and his wife Isabella d'Este. The patronage continued with their eldest son Federico II Gonzaga, who was the fifth Marquis of Mantua. Leonbruno was the court painter for the Gonzaga family from 1506–24.

Leonbruno's most significant artistic commission was his decoration of the Camera Grande in the Gonzaga palace in Mantua, which was completed in 1523 for his patron Isabella d'Este.

== Biography ==
Lorenzo Leonbruno was adopted by the Mantuan court painter Giovanni Luca de' Liombini, and was raised as Liombini's own son. Although there remains little extant documentation on his early life and artistic training, some of Leonbruno's early training is attributed to the workshop of Andrea Mantegna, who was a highly distinguished court painter for Lodovico Gonzaga and the Gonzaga family. Mantegna painted frescoes and portraits for the Gonzaga court in their palace at Mantua in the mid-late 15th century, as well as some interior paintings of the Palazzo di San Sebastiano. Leonbruno's training with Andrea Mantegna ended with Mantegna's death in 1506. After Mantegna's death, the Gongaza's selected several artists from his workshop to replace him as court artists, among them Lorenzo Costa the Elder, whom Leonbruno would train under, and later, Lorenzo Leonbruno.

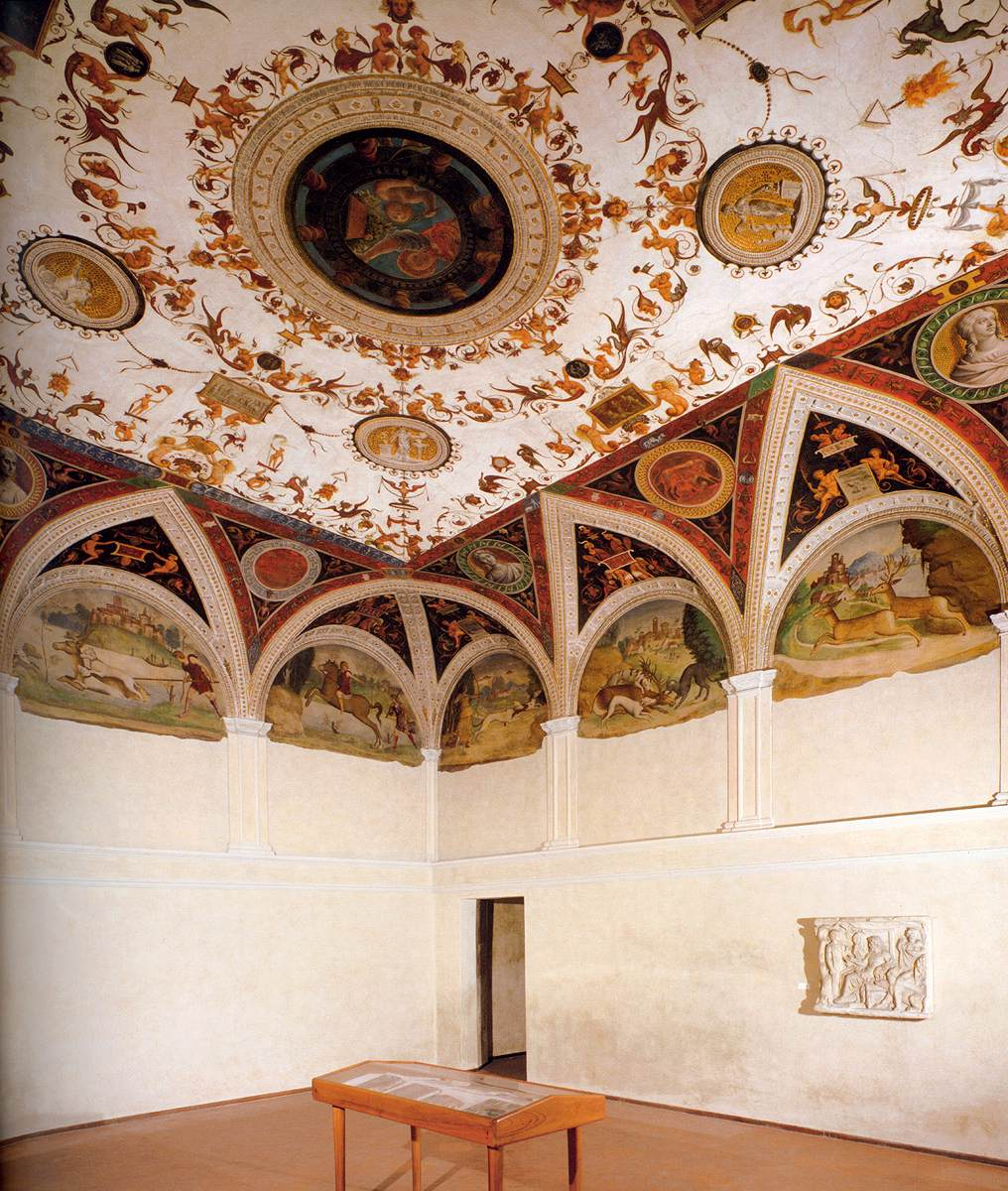
Lorenzo Leonbruno. 1520. Camera Grande: Ceiling Fresco of Isabella d'Este's Widow Apartment, Corte Vecchia, in the Ducal Palace in Mantua.

As a young artist, Leonbruno travelled around major artistic cities in Renaissance Italy; mainly Florence (1504-1506), Venice (1511), and Rome (1521). In 1504, Leonbruno was taken under the care of Isabella d'Este, who was one of Liombini and Lorenzo Costa the Elder's patrons. During the short period from 1504-1506, he was sent to Florence on d'Este's recommendation to work in the workshop of Pietro Perugino, since he was a young man and in the early stages of his artistic career. Leonbruno also trained under Lorenzo Costa in Mantua during the year 1508, who was a court painter for Lodovico Gonzaga and Isabella d'Este.

In 1512, Leonbruno returned to Mantua under the supervision and commission of Lorenzo Costa the Elder. He was assigned the task of painting interior rooms in the Palazzo di San Sebastiano; the favorite residence of Francesco II Gonzaga. For this project, Leonbruno worked alongside another Mantuan artist, Dosso Dossi.

In 1521, Leonbruno was sent to Rome by Federico II Gonzaga-the eldest son of Isabella d'Este- to study the works of Raphael and Michelangelo. Federico ordered the ambassador Baldassare Castiglione to look after Leonbruno during his visit. However, Castiglione held Raphael's lead pupil, Giulio Romano, in higher favor. Romano would soon replace Leonbruno as the Mantuan court painter for the Gonzaga family in 1524. As a result, Leonbruno remained in Rome for one month, and then returned to Mantua. Upon his return to Mantua, Leonbruno was commissioned by Federico Gonzaga to redecorate the interior rooms on the ground floor of Castello di San Georgio, one of the ducal palaces of the Gonzaga family. Following the tradition of Mantuan rulers, and after his accession to power in 1519, Federico had relocated to the apartments on the ground floor of Castello di San Georgio. He thus commissioned the court painter Leonbruno to redecorate his suite with his family's heraldry, symbols of power, and the Gonzaga family coat of arms. Leonbruno worked on this commission from 1521-1523. These works have since been destroyed.

Despite his large commissions to decorate the Gonzaga palaces, Leonbruno did not produce many works during his artistic career and only four of his signed works have survived. The most prominent of these signed works are the Adoration of the Shepherds c. 1505, and the Judgement of Midas, c. 1512-1514, with the signature located on the ground near the hand of the figure clad in a blue tunic. The others are the Lamentation Over the Dead Christ, and Saint Jerome Contemplating His Crucifix, although the date of creation remains unknown.

Although Leonbruno's career as the court painter for the Gonzaga family ended in 1524, he remained active as a painter until 1533. It was in this later phase of his artistic career that Leonbruno took interest in military architecture. In 1530, he was forced to leave Mantua on account of Giulio Romano. He travelled to Milan to pursue architectural design, and from 1530-1532 he was employed as an architect and military engineer for the Duke of Milan Francis II Sforza. However, none of his architectural designs or drawings survived. In 1532, Leonbruno returned to Mantua where he was commissioned by Aloisio Gonzaga to produce architectural designs for his fortress, Castel Geoffredo. However, his architectural designs for the fortress no longer survive. According to most sources, from 1531-1532 Benedetta Gonzaga commissioned Leonbruno to paint an altarpiece for an altar of which the location and name remain unknown today. The work, titled Madonna and Child Enthroned with Saint Lawrence, Saint Peter, and Saint Louis of Toulouse, still survives today, and is now in the Museo Poldi Pezzoli in Milan. This is primarily one of the final paintings Leonbruno produced in the last phase of his artistic career.

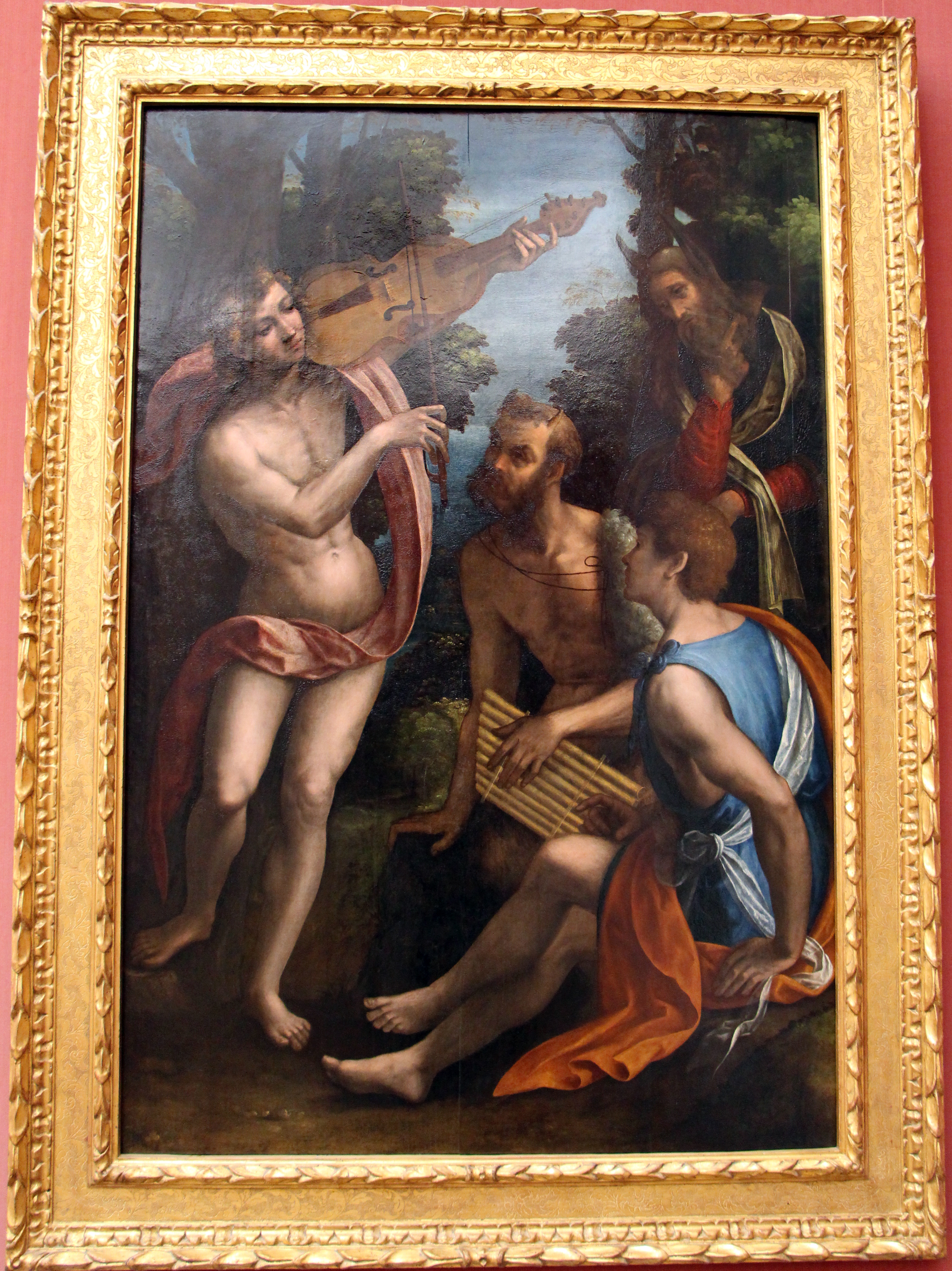
Lorenzo Leonbruno. c.1512-1514. Il Giudizio di Mida (The Judgement of Midas). Now Gemäldegalerie, Berlin.

== Major works and commissions ==
=== Palazzo di San Sebastiano ===
In 1512, Leonbruno returned to Mantua on commission by Francesco II Gonzaga to decorate the interior of one of his private residences, the Palazzo di San Sebastiano. Leonbruno worked under the supervision of Lorenzo Costa the Elder, as well as alongside the Mantuan artists Dosso Dossi. The interior rooms Leonbruno decorated with wall paintings include: the oratory, a camerino (dressing room), the loggia, and numerous smaller rooms. It is here that Leonbruno supposedly painted one of his most well-known works, Apollo and the Nine Muses. The work was a large canvas painting depicting Apollo playing music and the nine Muses singing to Francesco II Gonzaga. However, it still remains unclear as to whether or not it was Leonbruno who produced this art piece. A document dating to the early 16th century attributes this canvas painting to Leonbruno, but recent scholarship has disregarded this document and has adopted the theory that Leonbruno did not produce this work. This work, along with the rest of his wall paintings in the Palazzo di San Sebastiano, have all been destroyed.

=== Camera Grande della Palazzo Ducale di Mantova ===
In 1520-1522, Leonbruno was commissioned by Isabella d'Este to decorate the interior vaulted ceiling of her apartment in the Corte Vecchia: the room where she lived as a widow after her husband's death in 1519. The apartment was known as the Camera Grande, which subsequently became the name of his work on the interior ceiling; a vast ceiling fresco depicting scenes of hunting in lunettes encircling a central oculus portraying a fictional scene. The fresco features exquisite gold and white stucco which frame thematic scenes from antiquity. It has been said that this work was inspired by Andrea Mantegna's well-known earlier ceiling paintings in the Camera Picta. The work still survives today, and the date of the decorations created by Leonbruno are mentioned in a document dating to 1522.

== List of works and current locations ==
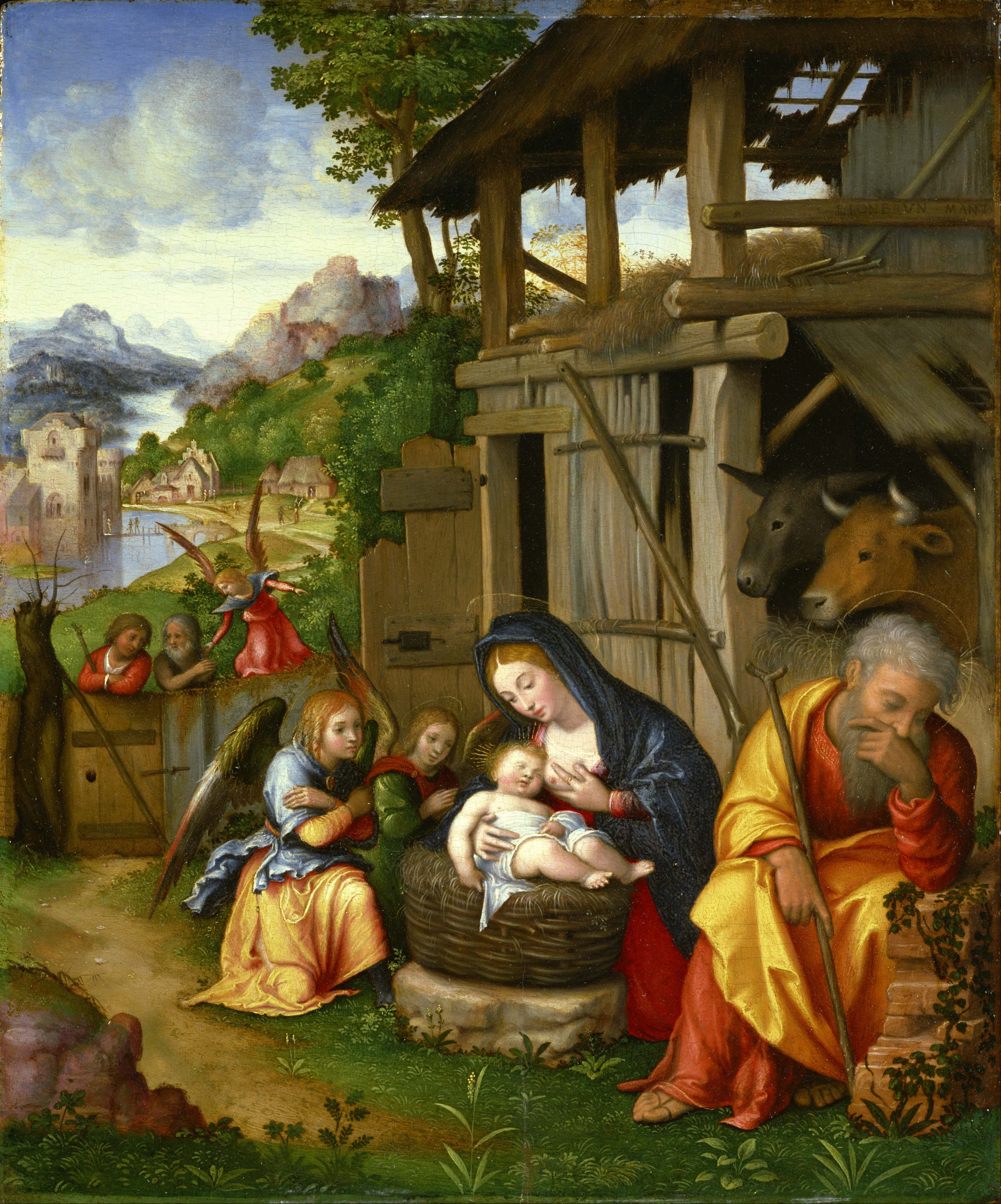
Lorenzo Leonbruno. 1515. The Nativity, National Museum of Western Art, Tokyo

- Amymone (Allegory of Mantua) c. 1495-1505. Oil on canvas. Private Collection.
- Adoration of the Shepherds 1505. Oil on panel. Worcester Art Museum.
- Judgement of Midas 1512-1514. Berlin: Staatliche Museen, Gemäldegalerie.
- Saint Giovanni Evangelista (Saint John the Evangelist) 1515. Porto Ercole: San Paolo della Croce (Church of Saint Paul of the Cross).
- The Nativity c. 1515. Oil on panel. Tokyo: National Museum of Western Art.
- Camera Granda or Scalcheria (19th century name). c. 1522-23. Ceiling Fresco. Mantua: Ducal Palace.
- Nymph Fishing and a Youth Hunting 1522. Fresco Lunette in the Camera Grande. Mantua: Palazzo Ducale.
- Sleeping Nymph, or Allegory with Mercury and a Nude 1522-1523. Oil on canvas. Florence: Uffizi Gallery.
- Calumny of Apelles, or Allegory of Fortune 1524-1525. Oil on wood panel. Milan: Pinacoteca di Brera.
- Saints Peter, Paul, and Anthony of Padua 1530. Mantua: Church of Sant'Apollonia.
- Allegorical Scene. Date unknown. Oil on canvas. Verona: Castelvecchio Museum.
- Madonna and Child in Glory with Archangel Michael, Saint John the Evangelist, and Saint Longinus, attributed to Leonbruno. Date unknown. Altarpiece. Mantua: Palazzo Ducale.
- Saint Jerome. Date Unknown, but associated with his last phase of painting in 1530s. Mantua: Private Collection.
- Madonna and Child Enthroned with Saint Lawrence, Saint Peter, and Saint Louis of Toulouse c. 1531. Milan: Museo Poldi Pezzoli. Occasionally attributed to Ippolito Costa, the son of Lorenzo Costa the Elder. Cf. for scholarly debate.
- Lamentation over the Dead Christ c.1533. Mantua: Museo di Palazzo Ducale.
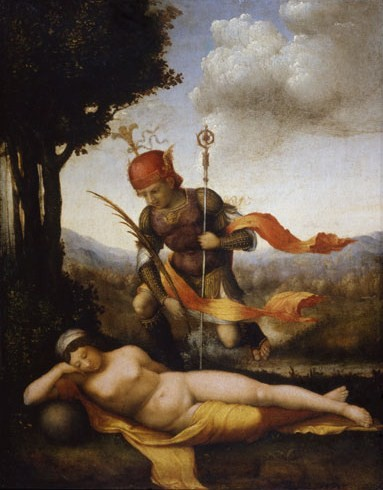
- Lorenzo Leonbruno. 1522-23. Sleeping Nymph. Uffizi, Florence.

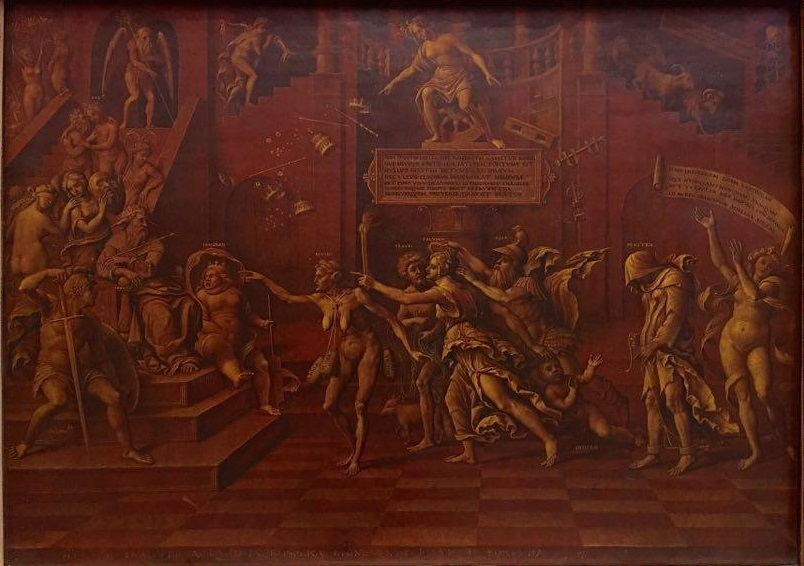
Lorenzo Leonbruno. 1524-1525. Allegory of Fortune, Pinacoteca di Brera, Milan

== References and Further reading ==
1. Bourne, M.H. 1998. Out from the Shadow of Isabella: The Artistic Patronage of Francesco II Gonzaga, Fourth Marquis of Mantua (1484-1519). Harvard University.
2. Brown, M. 1997. "The Palazzo di San Sebastiano (1506-1512) and the Patronage of Francesco II Gonzaga, Fourth Marquis of Mantua." Gaz. B.A. 79: 131-180.
3. Chambers, D.S. 1997. "Review of Lorenzo Leonbruno: Un Pittore a Corte nella Mantova di Primo Cinquecento by Leandro Ventura." The Burlington Magazine 139: 485.
4. DeMarchi, A. 1998. "Dosso versus Leonbruno." In Dosso's Fate: Painting and Court Culture in Renaissance Italy. L. Ciammitti, ed. Los Angeles: The Getty Research Institute. p. 152-175.
5. Furlotti, B. and G. Rebecchini. 2008. The Art of Mantua: Power and Patronage in the Renaissance. Getty Publications.
6. Rebecchini, G. 2002. Private Collectors in Mantua, 1500-1603. Rome: Edizioni di Storia e Letteratura.
7. Regan, L. 2013. "If So in Adversity: Mastering Fortune in Lorenzo Leonbruno's Calumny of Apelles." Journal of California Italian Studies 4:1-45.
8. Regan, L.K. 2004. Creating the Court Lady: Isabella D'Este as Patron and Subject. University of California Berkeley.
9. Russell, F. 1977. "Saleroom Discoveries: A Nativity by Lorenzo Leonbruno." Burl. Mag. 119: 601.
10. Ventura, L. 1995. Lorenzo Leonbruno: Un Pittore a Corte nella Mantova di Primo Cinquecento. Roma: Bulzoni.
11. Farquhar, Maria (1855). Ralph Nicholson Wornum (ed.). Biographical catalogue of the principal Italian painters. p. 83.
