= Holy Family (El Greco, Museo de Santa Cruz) =

Painting by El Greco

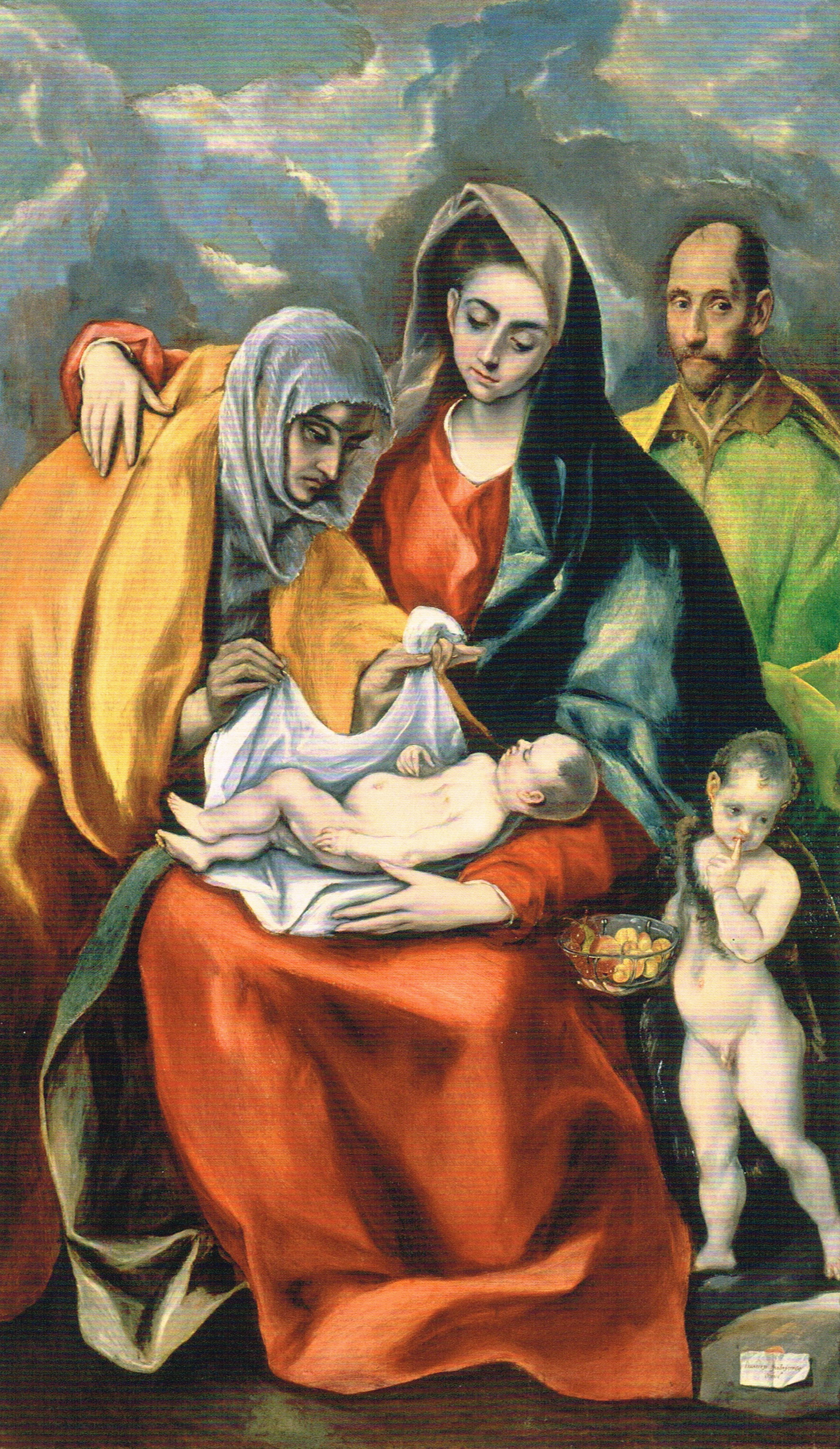
- Artist: El Greco
- Year: 1586-1588
- Medium: oil on canvas
- Dimensions: 178 cm × 105 cm (70 in × 41 in)
- Location: Museo de Santa Cruz, Toledo

Holy Family is a 1586-1588 oil on canvas painting by El Greco, painted during his time in Toledo and now in that city's Museum of Santa Cruz.

He frequently returned to the subject of the Holy Family. In this variant he shows the Christ Child in Mary's lap. To the left is Mary's mother St Anne, whilst to the right are Saint Joseph and the infant John the Baptist. A later 1590s variant uses a similar composition but omits John and changes the poses of Joseph and Anne.

== See also ==
- List of works by El Greco

== Bibliography ==
- (in Spanish) ÁLVAREZ LOPERA, José, El Greco, Madrid, Arlanza, 2005, Biblioteca «Descubrir el Arte», (colección «Grandes maestros»). ISBN 84-95503-44-1.
- (in Spanish) SCHOLZ-HÄNSEL, Michael, El Greco, Colonia, Taschen, 2003. ISBN 978-3-8228-3173-1.
