= Ippolito Costa =

Italian painter

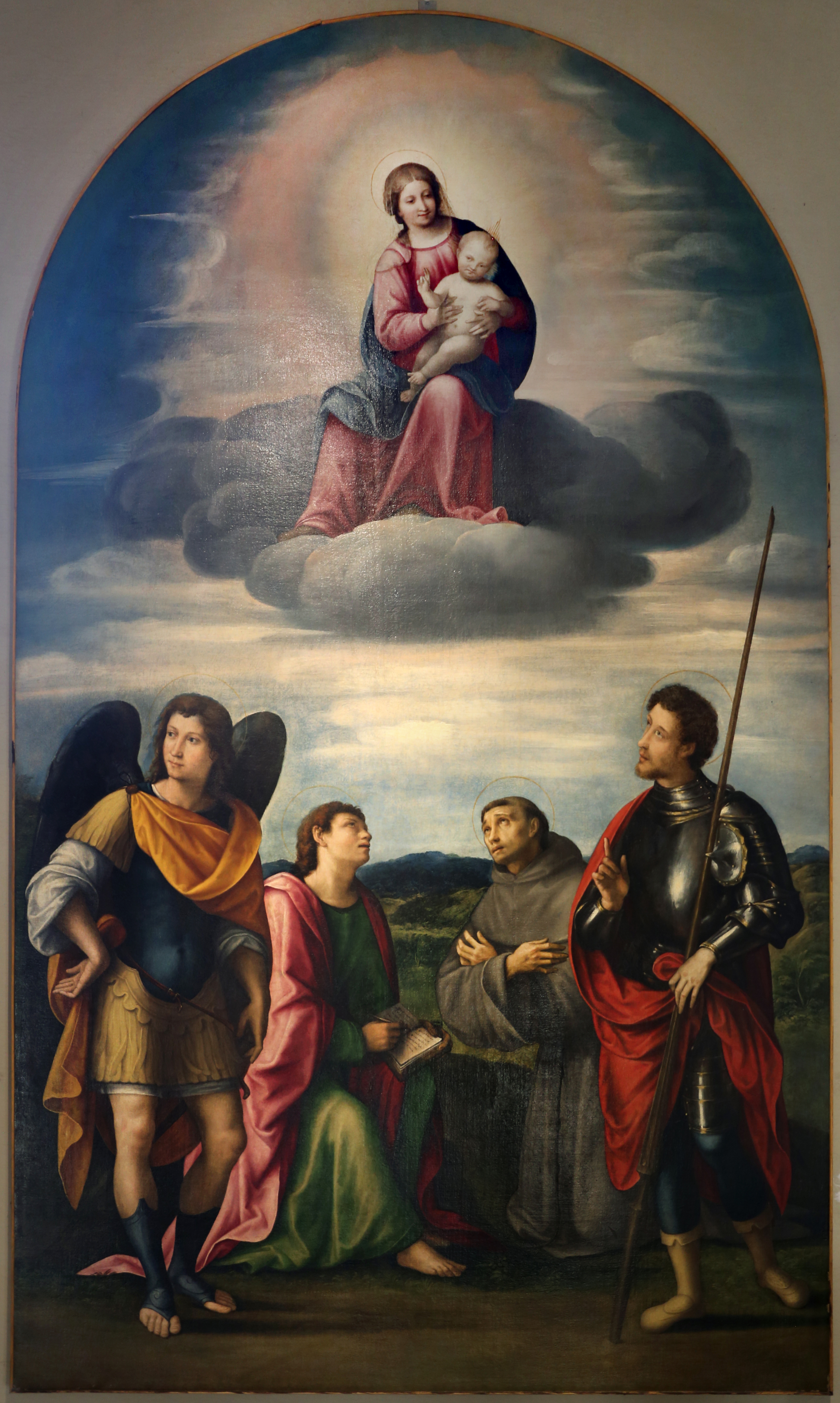
Madonna and Saints, Mantua, palazzo Ducale

Ippolito Costa (1506 – 8 November 1561) was an Italian painter of the Renaissance period. He was born in Mantua, the son of the painter Lorenzo Costa. Although not a pupil of Giulio Romano, his style closely imitated that master. He mentored his brother Girolamo Costa (1525–1595) and the painter Bernardino Campi.
