= Holy Family (Lorenzo Costa) =

Painting by Lorenzo Costa

- Nativity (English)
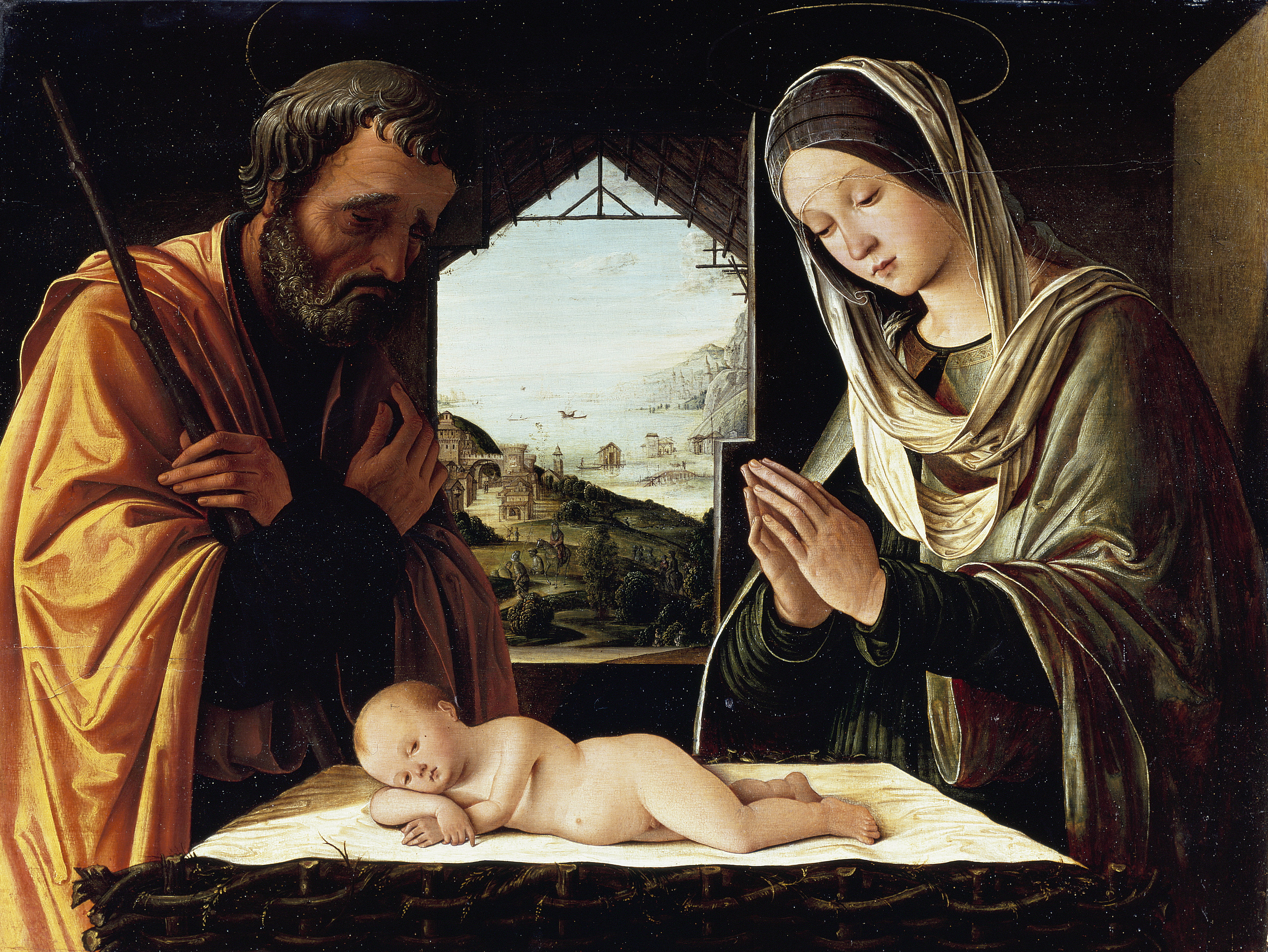
- Artist: Lorenzo Costa
- Year: c. 1490
- Location: Museum of Fine Arts of Lyon; Lyon

Holy Family or Nativity is an oil on panel painting created by Lorenzo Costa, Italian painter of the Renaissance, around 1490. It was acquired by the Museum of Fine Arts of Lyon in 1892.
