= Greenfields railway station =

Railway station in Adelaide, South Australia

Coordinates: 34°47′55″S 138°37′0″E

Greenfields
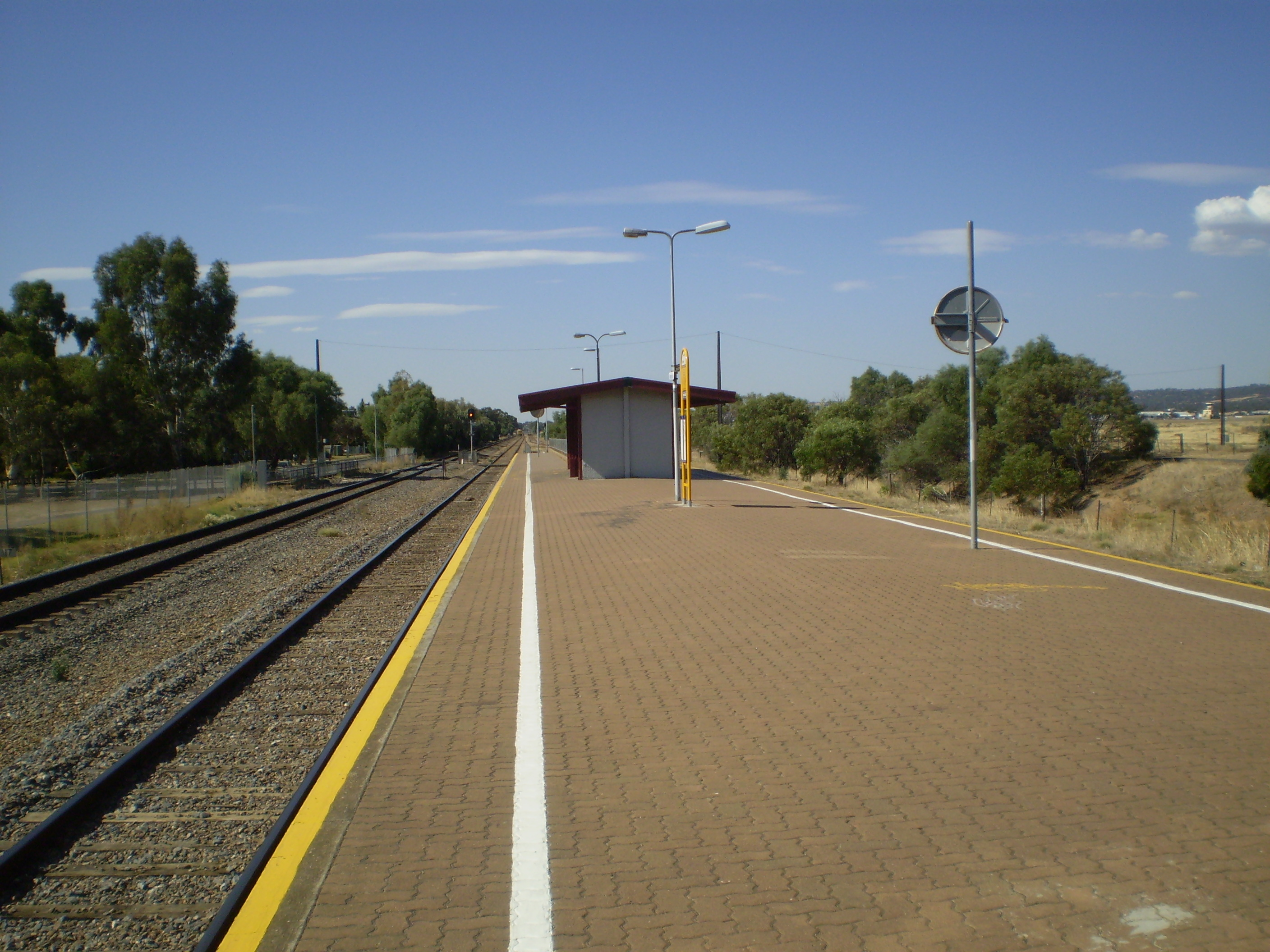
- North-east bound view from Platform 1, March 2008

General information
- Location: McCabe Avenue, Parafield
- Owner: Department for Infrastructure & Transport
- Operator: Adelaide Metro
- Line: Gawler
- Distance: 15.5 km from Adelaide
- Platforms: 2 (island platform)
- Tracks: 2
- Connections: None

Construction
- Structure type: Ground
- Parking: Yes
- Cycle facilities: No
- Accessible: Yes

Other information
- Station code: 16524 (to City); 18544 (to Gawler Central)
- Website: Adelaide Metro

History
- Opened: 1969

Services
Preceding station	Adelaide Metro	Following station
Mawson Lakes towards Adelaide	Gawler line	Parafield Gardens towards Gawler Central
Location

Greenfields railway station is located on the Gawler line. Situated adjacent to Parafield Airport, in the northern Adelaide suburb of Parafield, it is 15.5 kilometres (9.6 mi) from Adelaide station.

== History ==
The station opened in 1969 as Green Field, later changing to Greenfields.

It is one of only two stations on the Gawler Central line to have a pedestrian underpass (the other is Parafield Gardens). The other stations have had theirs closed due to concerns with safety and vandalism. To the west of the station lies the Australian Rail Track Corporation standard gauge line to Crystal Brook.

In 2021, it has received several upgrades including a deep cleaning, fresh coat of paint, LED lighting and new bins. This is a part of the State governments station refresh program.

== Platforms and Services ==
Greenfields has two island platforms and is serviced by Adelaide Metro Gawler line services. Trains are scheduled every 30 minutes, seven days a week.

Platform	Destination
1	Gawler and Gawler Central
2	Adelaide
