= Parafield Gardens, South Australia =

Parafield Gardens
- Suburb
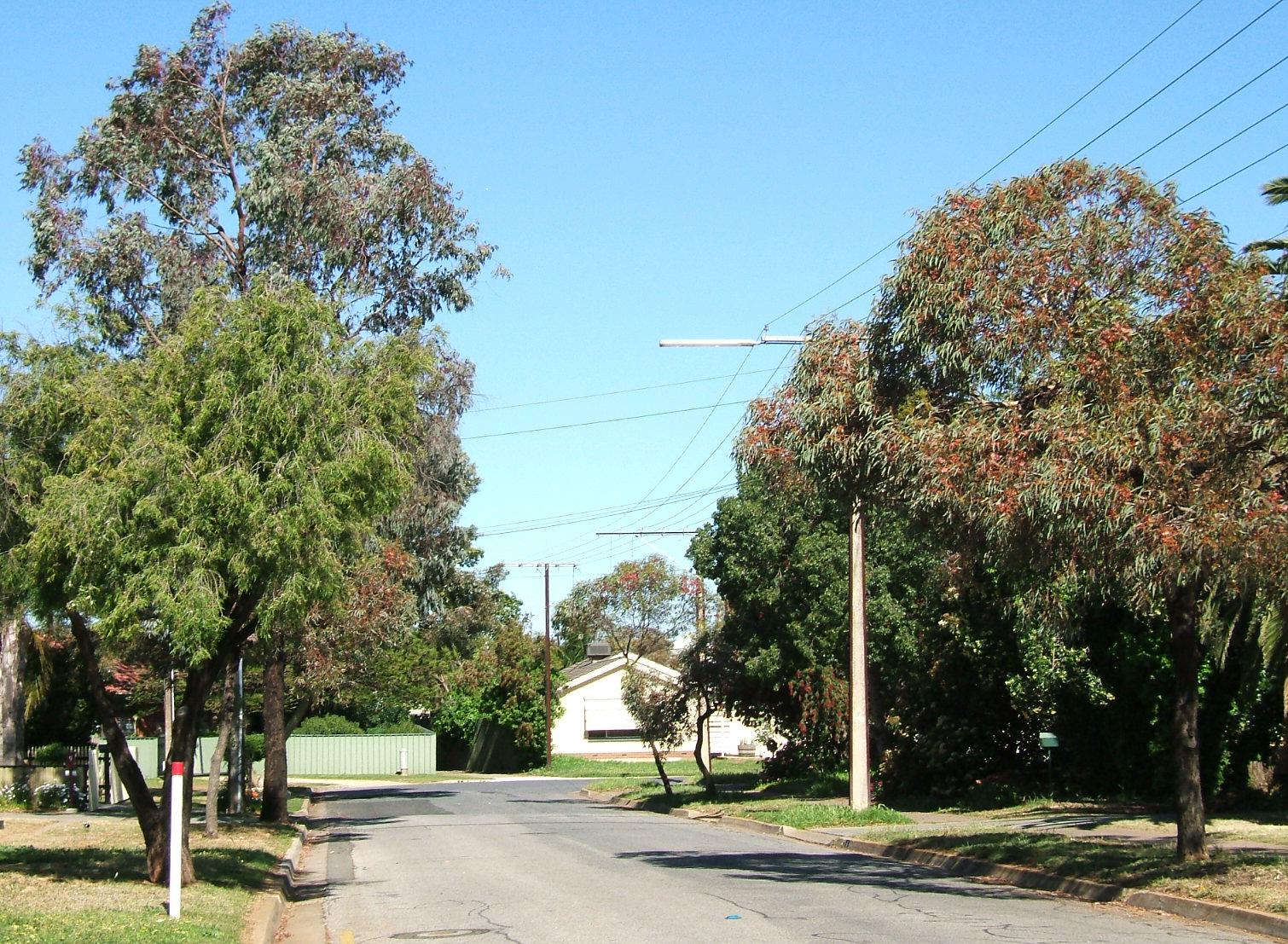
- Street in Parafield Gardens

- Country: Australia
- State: South Australia
- City: Adelaide
- LGA: City of Salisbury
- Location: 16 km (9.9 mi) from Adelaide

Government
  - State electorate: Playford
  - Federal division: Makin

Area
  - Total: 7.1 km^{2} (2.7 sq mi)

Population
  - Totals: 18,467 (SAL 2021); 14,586 (2006 census)
- Postcode: 5107
Suburbs around Parafield Gardens
Paralowie	Salisbury Downs	Salisbury South
Green Fields	Parafield Gardens	Parafield
Green Fields	Mawson Lakes	Parafield

Parafield Gardens (pronounced /ˈpærə-/) is a suburb of Adelaide, South Australia. The suburb is largely residential, with a pocket of industrial land in the southwest corner. There are two small shopping centres in the area, one on Salisbury Highway, and another on Shepherdson Road.

== History ==
Parafield Gardens was originally a subdivision of section 2258 of the Hundred of Yatala enclosing land south of the Little Para River and Kings Road and northeast of today's Salisbury Highway. In 1881 the government proposed the creation of a general cemetery on the subdivision but the plan was abandoned by 1906. Land in the subdivision began to be used as an experimental agricultural farm, followed by a poultry farm in 1911, known as Parafield Farm. In 1958, Matters & Co. offered residential land in the area bounded by Salisbury Highway, Shepherdson Road, Sunderland Avenue, and Catalina Avenue. In the 1970s the South Australian Housing Trust began building properties in the area. At some time between then and 2000 the suburb name of Parafield Gardens was formally adopted. The Pine Lakes Estate was established in the early 2000s southwest of the intersection of Salisbury Highway and Kings Road.

Parafield Gardens Post Office opened on 25 September 1961.

== Schools ==
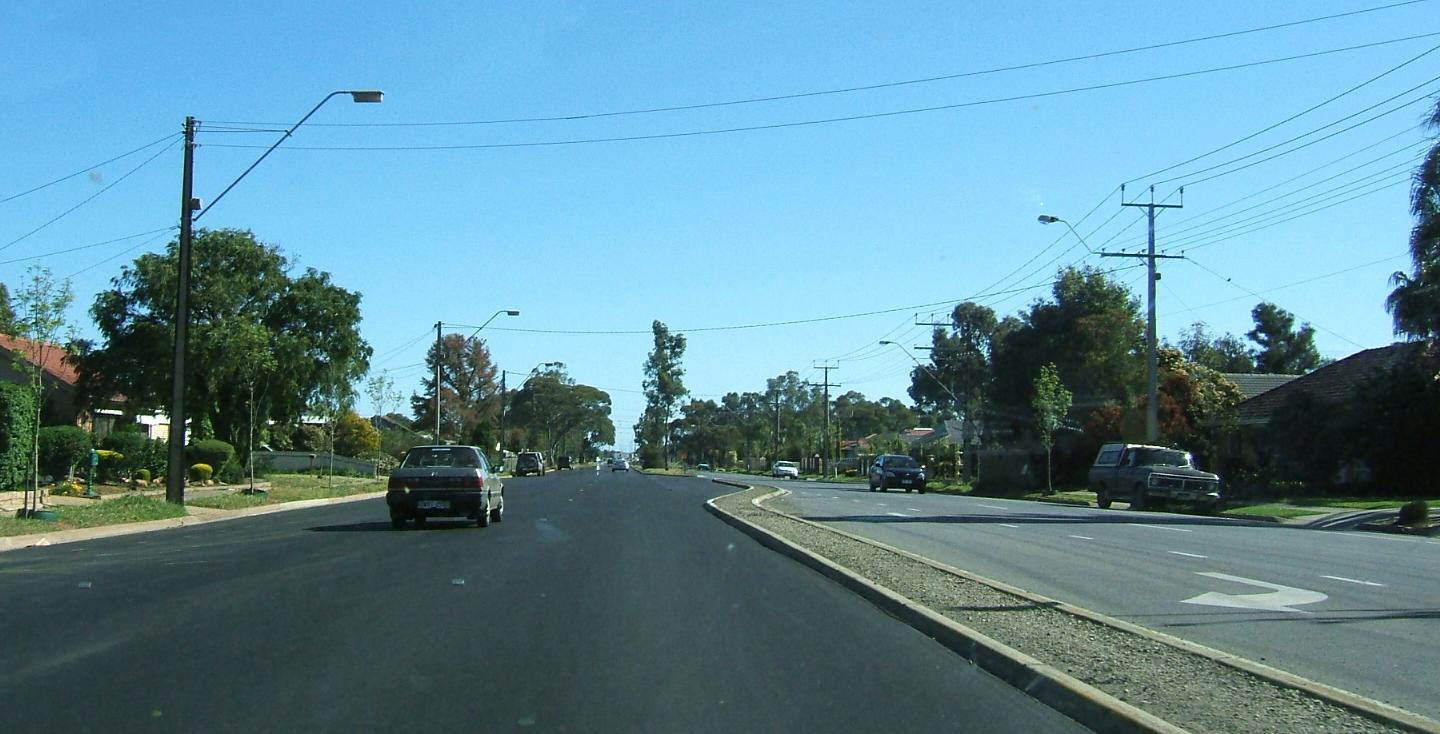
Salisbury Highway, looking south

Parafield Gardens has six schools in its area and four of which are public. Karrendi Primary School, founded in 1969, is a public primary school on Bradman Road. Parafield Gardens High School, opened in 1976, is a public secondary school located next to Parafield Gardens Primary, a larger public primary school.

Garden College is an Islamic school, catering for year levels Reception to Year 12.

Parafield Gardens Primary, Parafield Gardens High and two private schools; Holy Family Catholic School and Garden College are all on Shepherdson Road. A fourth primary school, The Pines School, is located on Andrew Smith Drive.

Karrendi Primary School and Parafield Gardens High School were attended by Australian international soccer player Nestory Irankunda, who began his professional career with Adelaide United before transferring to Bayern Munich in 2024. The South Australian Department for Education publicly recognised Irankunda as a former student of both schools following his debut at the 2026 FIFA World Cup.
