= List of schools in the Roman Catholic Diocese of Baton Rouge =

This is a list of schools in the Roman Catholic Diocese of Baton Rouge.

== High schools ==
- Ascension Catholic High School, Donaldsonville
- Catholic High School, Baton Rouge
- Catholic High School of Pointe Coupee, New Roads
- Saint Thomas Aquinas Diocesan Regional High School, Hammond
- St. John the Evangelist Interparochial High School, Plaquemine
- St. Joseph's Academy, Baton Rouge
- St. Michael the Archangel Diocesan Regional High School, Shenandoah

== Elementary schools ==
Ascension Parish

- Ascension Catholic Diocesan Regional School, Donaldsonville
- St. John Primary School, Prairieville
- St. Theresa Middle School, Gonzales

Assumption Parish

- St. Elizabeth School, Paincourtville

East Baton Rouge Parish

- Baton Rouge
  - Most Blessed Sacrament School
  - Our Lady of Mercy School
  - Redemptorist St. Gerard School
  - Sacred Heart of Jesus School
  - St. Aloysius School
  - St. Francis Xavier School
  - St. George School
  - St. Jean Vianney School
  - St. Jude the Apostle School
  - St. Thomas More School
- Central City
  - St. Alphonsus Liguori School

Iberville Parish

- St. John Interparochial School, Plaquemine

Pointe Coupee Parish

- Catholic Interparochial Elementary School of Pointe Coupee, New Roads

St. James Parish

- St. Peter Chanel Interparochial School, Paulina

Tangipahoa Parish

- Holy Ghost School, Hammond
- Mater Dolorosa School, Independence
- St. Joseph School, Ponchatoula

West Baton Rouge Parish

- Holy Family School, Port Allen

== Former schools ==
- Holy Savior School
- Redemptorist High School
- St. Louis King of France Elementary School
