= Holy Family (El Greco, Hospital de Tavera) =

1595 painting by El Greco

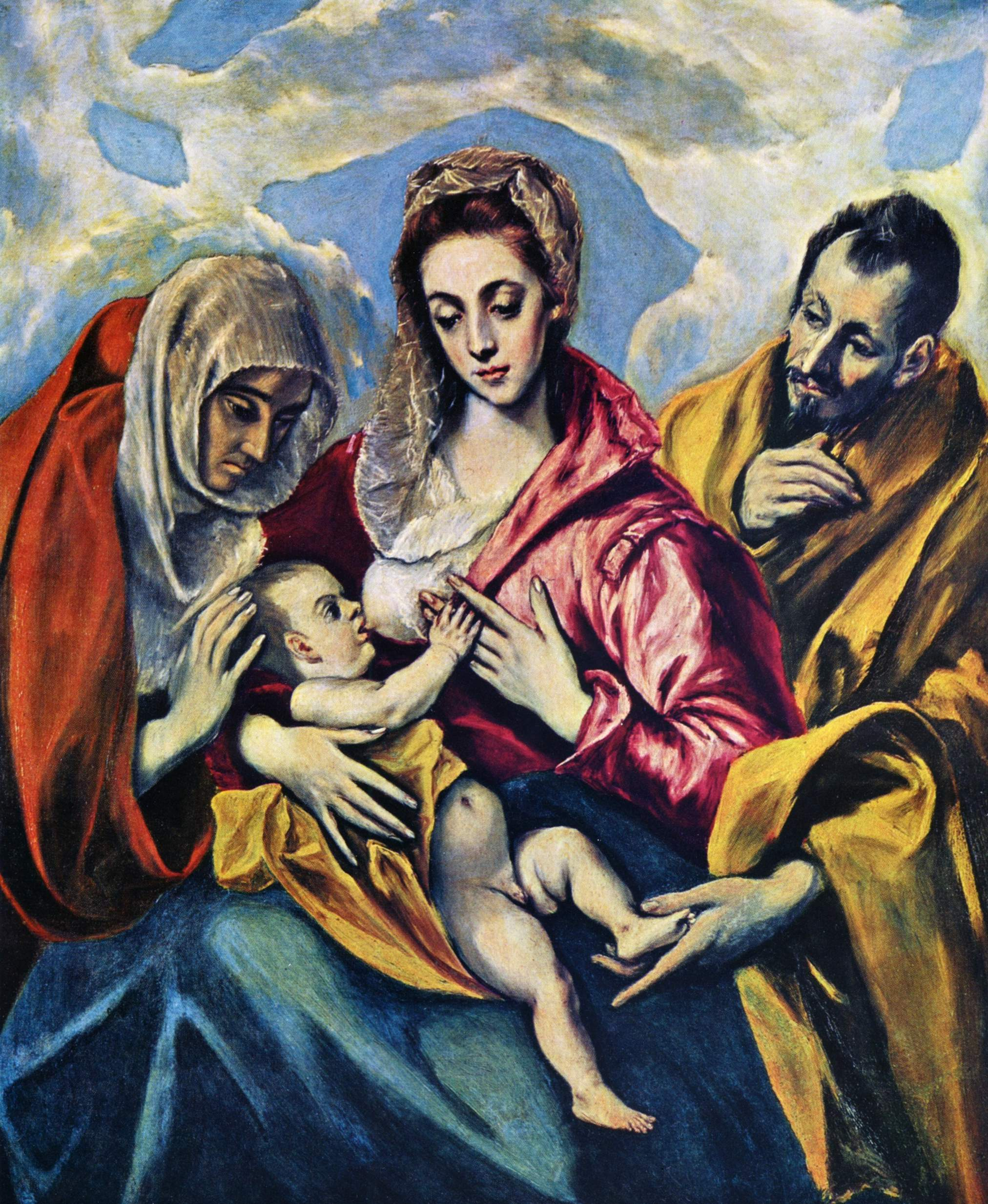
- Artist: El Greco
- Dimensions: 127 cm × 106 cm (50 in × 42 in)
- Location: Hospital de Tavera, Toledo

Holy Family is a 1595 oil on canvas painting by El Greco, painted during his time in Toledo and now in the Hospital de Tavera in that city.

The work is very similar to those painted by the same artist during his stay in Rome. The artist frequently returned to the theme of the Holy Family. Though this work has similarities to his work on the same subject now in the Museum of Santa Cruz, he has omitted the infant John the Baptist, painted the Virgin as a nursing Madonna and altered the pose of Saint Joseph and the position of St Anne.

== See also ==
- List of works by El Greco

== Bibliography ==
- (in Spanish) ÁLVAREZ LOPERA, José, El Greco, Madrid, Arlanza, 2005, Biblioteca «Descubrir el Arte», (colección «Grandes maestros»). ISBN 84-95503-44-1.
- (in Spanish) SCHOLZ-HÄNSEL, Michael, El Greco, Colonia, Taschen, 2003. ISBN 978-3-8228-3173-1.
