= Lorenzo Costa =

Italian painter (1460–1535)

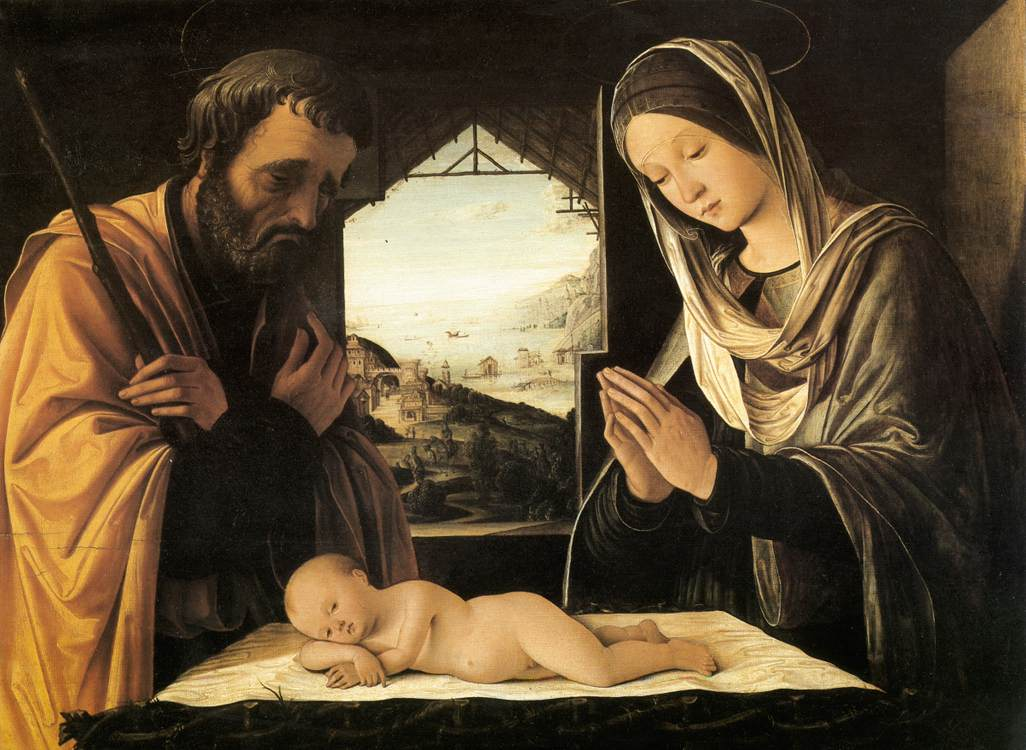
- Holy Family by Lorenzo Costa, at the Musée des Beaux-Arts, Lyon
- Born: Lorenzo Costa il Vecchio; 1460; Ferrara, Italy
- Died: 5 March 1535 (aged 74–75); Mantua, Italy
- Known for: Painting
- Movement: Italian Renaissance

Lorenzo Costa (1460 – 5 March 1535) was an Italian painter.

== Biography ==
He was born in Ferrara, but moved to Bologna by his early twenties, and was probably influenced by the Bolognese School. However, many artists worked in both cities, and thus some consider him a product of the School of Ferrara. It is possible that he trained with Cosimo Tura.

In 1483, he painted the famous Bentivoglio Altarpiece and other frescoes on the walls of the Bentivoglio chapel in San Giacomo Maggiore. He was a great friend of Francesco Francia, who was much influenced by him. In 1509, he moved to Mantua to become the court painter of Marquis Francesco Gonzaga and Isabella d'Este. For the latter's studiolo in the Ducal Palace, he painted the Allegory of Isabella d'Este's Coronation (now at the Louvre) and the Reign of Comus, two mythological paintings based on Mantegna's drawings.

He died at Mantua in 1535. His sons Ippolito and Girolamo were also painters, as was Girolamo's son, Lorenzo the Younger. Contemporaries who worked with or under him include Cosimo Tura, Dosso Dossi, Ludovico Mazzolino, Lorenzo Leonbruno, and Niccolò Pisano.
