= Holy Family High School =

Holy Family High School may refer to one of the following schools:

- Holy Family High School (Glendale, California) in Glendale, California
- Holy Family High School (Broomfield, Colorado) in Broomfield, Colorado
- Holy Family High School (Lindsay, Nebraska) in Lindsay, Nebraska
- Holy Family High School (New Bedford, Massachusetts) in New Bedford, Massachusetts
- Holy Family High School (Mumbai) in Mumbai, India
- Holy Family Diocesan High School in Huntington, New York
- Holy Family Cristo Rey High School (Birmingham, Alabama) in Birmingham, Alabama

== See also ==
- Holy Family School (disambiguation)
- Holy Family Catholic High School (disambiguation)
- Holy Family (disambiguation)
