= Holy Family Catholic School, Keighley =

School in Keighley, West Yorkshire, England

Holy Family Catholic School
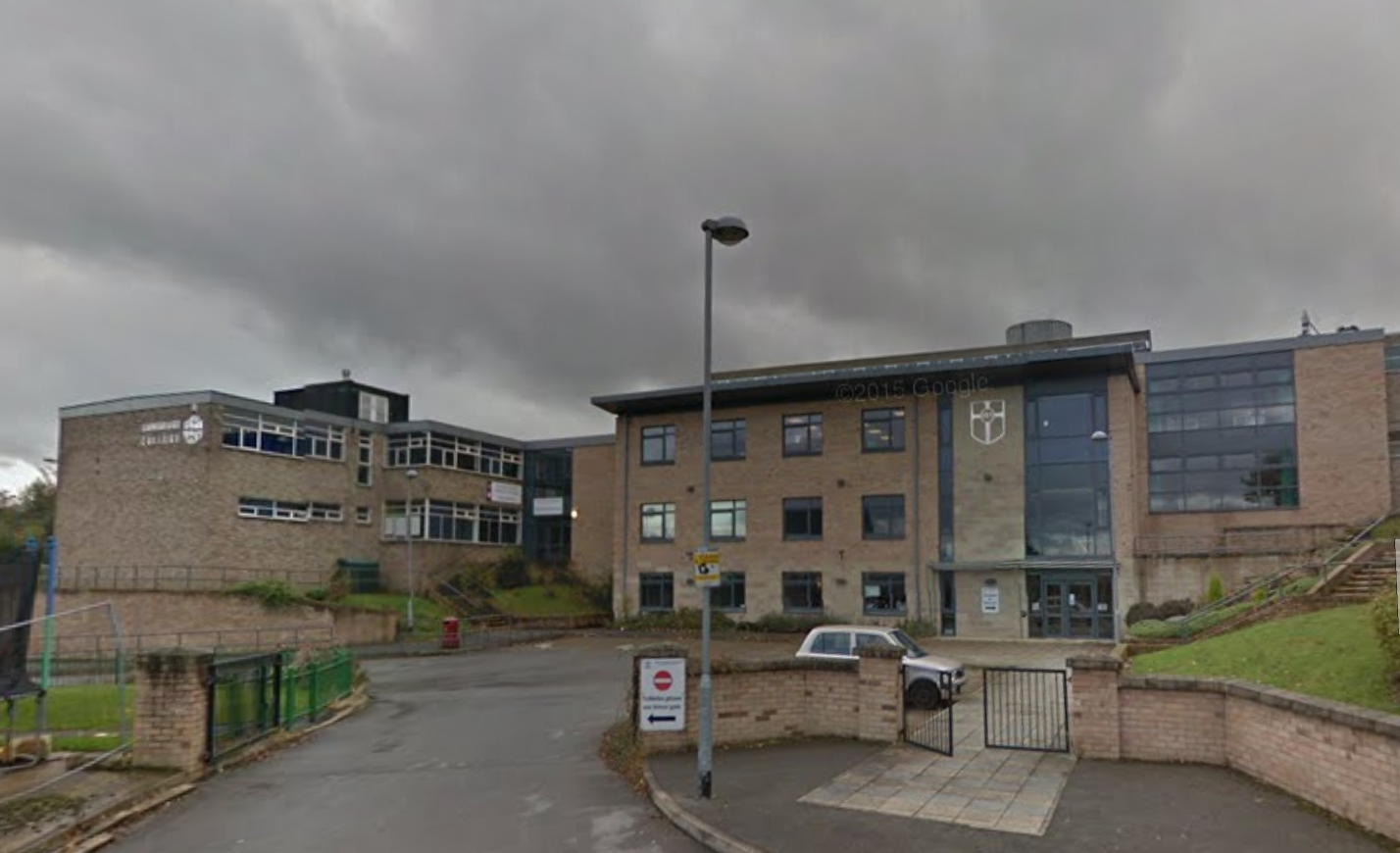
- Holy Family Catholic School, Keighley

Location
- Spring Gardens Lane; Keighley, West Yorkshire, BD20 6LH; England; 53.8759°N 1.9173°W

Information
- Type: Academy
- Religious affiliation: Roman Catholic
- Established: 1965 as The Holy Family Catholic School
- Local authority: Bradford
- Trust: Blessed Christopher Wharton Catholic Academy Trust
- Department for Education URN: 149299 Tables
- Ofsted: Reports
- Headteacher: Mark Ambler
- Gender: Coeducational
- Age: 11 to 18
- Enrolment: 989
- Houses: Fountains; Jervaulx; Rievaulx
- Website: https://www.holyfamilyschool.uk/

The Holy Family Catholic School is a coeducational Roman Catholic secondary school and sixth form serving the parishes and communities in and around the districts of Keighley, Haworth, and Skipton in West Yorkshire, England.

The school opened in May 1965. The school celebrated its 50th birthday in 2015.

Previously a voluntary aided school administered by City of Bradford Metropolitan District Council, in August 2022 The Holy Family Catholic School converted to academy status. The school is now sponsored by the Blessed Christopher Wharton Catholic Academy Trust. the school continues to be under the jurisdiction of the Roman Catholic Diocese of Leeds.

== Notable alumni and staff ==
- James Atkin – Former pop star, member of EMF. Currently a music teacher at the school.
- Pauline Anderson (nee Melvin) OBE- Leading Educationalist and Traveller Activist. Attended the school 1973-1980. Former head teacher Haworth Primary School and Director of Education Derby City Council. National SEND and AP expert and current chair of Department for Education Stakeholder Group for Gypsies, Roma and Travellers; chair of trustees The Traveller Movement London. Awarded an OBE for services to children and young people in 2020.
