= Canigiani Holy Family =

Painting by Raphael

The Canigiani Holy Family
- Sacra Famiglia Canigiani (Italian)
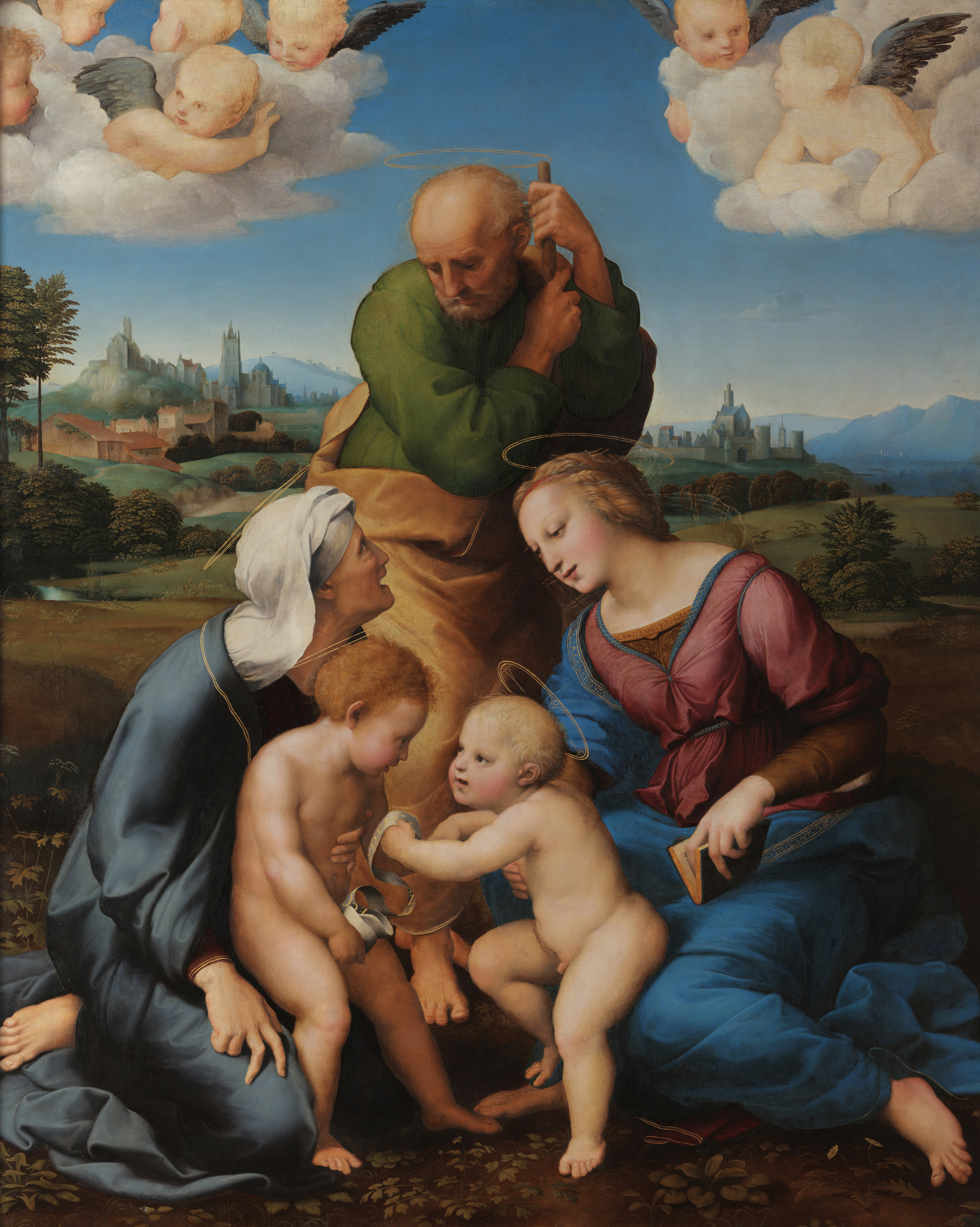
- Artist: Raphael
- Year: c. 1505–1506
- Medium: Oil on wood
- Dimensions: 131 cm × 107 cm (52 in × 42 in)
- Location: Alte Pinakothek, Munich

The Canigiani Holy Family or Canigiani Madonna is an oil-on-wood painting by the Italian High Renaissance artist Raphael, executed circa 1507–1508.

It shows mainly (l.t.r.) Elisabeth with baby John the Baptist, Joseph, and Mary with infant baby Jesus. These figures of the New Testament maintain eye contact. The oil painting was bought from the painter by the Canigiani family in Florence for their Home altar.

It is part of the permanent collection of the Alte Pinakothek in Munich, Germany.

== Raphael’s Artistic Techniques ==
Early on his life, Raphael’s drawing style was influenced by his father, Giovanni Santi, who also was a painter. Raphael used ink as well as chalk to create his drawings. He would use soft strokes to create lifelike images. Raphael’s drawings covered different subject, just most were related to religion or biblical depictions. This is the case with Canigiani Holy Family.

Just as with his drawings, Raphael’s prints also covered many subjects, but were primarily about religion. Raphael used the traditional printmaking technique of etching onto plates and then creating his prints on paper. Similar to his drawings and paintings, Raphael’s paintings were also primarily about religious scenes. Raphael was hailed as an artist who painted the most complete images.

== The Painting ==
Canigiani Holy Family is an oil painting on a wood panel. The painting shows the Holy Family, consisting of Jesus Christ as a baby, the Virgin Mary, and Saint Joseph. The painting focuses on the baby Jesus, with the older figures looking on. Also present in the painting are Saint Elizabeth and a very young John the Baptist.

Raphael used vivid color and lighting to show the Holy Family in the daylight, while adding perspective which brings them to the front of the image. Depth is achieved by creating the images behind the Holy Family smaller, making them seem to be in the distance. Daylight is achieved through the use of soft blues and whites in the sky above. Borrowing form his history in drawing, Raphael is able to make each figure distinct from the whole. He does this through crisp, sharp lines as well as his use of color.

== Patrons ==
Canigiani Holy Family was commissioned by the Caniagini family in Florence to be placed on the altar at their home. The Caniagini family was a wealthy family involved in banking, and also had a large amount of political influence at the time. The primary patron from the family was Domenico di Bartolomeo Canigiani, who was deeply interested in the arts and supported many artists, Raphael among them.

== See also ==
- List of paintings by Raphael
