= List of consorts of Montferrat =

Consorts in the Marquisiate of Montferrat

The Marchioness and Duchesses of Montferrat were the consorts of the rulers of a territory in Piedmont south of the Po and east of Turin called Montferrat. The March of Montferrat was created by Berengar II of Italy in 950 during a redistribution of power in the northwest of his kingdom. It was originally named after and held by the Aleramici. In 1574, Montferrat was raised to a Duchy by Maximilian II, Holy Roman Emperor (see Duchy of Montferrat).

== Marchioness of Montferrat ==
=== House of Aleramici ===
Picture	Name	Father	Birth	Marriage	Became Marchioness	Ceased to be Marchioness	Death	Spouse
	Name Unknown							Guglielmo I
	Gerberga of Ivrea (Gerberga di Ivrea)	Berengar II of Italy (Ivrea)	945	-		-	-	Aleramo
	Name Unknown							Ottone I degli Aleramici
	Waza	The Miracula sancti Bononii records William's wife as Waza. She prayed at the tomb of Saint Bononio, abbot of Santissimi Michele e Genuario di Lucedio.						Guglielmo III degli Aleramici
	Adelaide of Susa (Adelasia di Susa)	Ulric Manfred II of Turin (Arduinici)	1014/20	before 19 January 1042	January 1142 husband's accession	14 March 1044/1045 husband's death	19 December 1091	Enrico degli Aleramici
	Constance of Savoy (Costanza di Savoia)	(Savoy)	-	-	- husband's accession	20 November 1084 husband's death	-	Ottone II degli Aleramici
	His first wife	-	-	-	20 November 1084 husband's accession	-		Guglielmo IV degli Aleramici
	Otta d'Agliè (Otta di Aglié)	Tibaldo d'Agliè	-	-		1100 husband's death	-	Guglielmo IV degli Aleramici
	Gisela of Burgundy (Gisella di Borgogna)	William I, Count of Burgundy (Ivrea)	1075	1105		May 1133		Ranieri degli Aleramici
	Judith of Babenberg (Giuditta di Babenberg)	Leopold III, Margrave of Austria (Babenberg)	late 1110s/1120	before 28 March 1133	May 1135 husband's accession	after 1168		Guglielmo V degli Aleramici
	Isabella I of Jerusalem (Isabella di Gerusalemme)	Amalric I, King of Jerusalem (Ingelger)	1172	24 November 1190	1191 husband's accession	28 April 1192 husband's death	May/June 1205	Corrado degli Aleramici
	Margaret of Hungary (Margherita d'Ungheria)	Béla III of Hungary (Árpád)	1175	9 August 1202		4 September 1207 husband's death	after 1223	
	Berta of Clavesana (Berta di Clavesana)	Bonifacio, Marquess of Clavesana and Count of Cortemiglia (Aleramici)	1180	9 August 1202	4 September 1207 husband's accession	1224		Guglielmo VI degli Aleramici
	Margaret of Savoy (Margherita di Savoia)	Amadeus IV, Count of Savoy (Savoy)	1224/28	9 December 1235		12 June 1253 husband's death	1254 or after 14 January 1264	Bonifacio II degli Aleramici
	Isabel de Clare (Isabella di Clare)	Richard de Clare, 6th Earl of Hertford (de Clares)	1240	June 1258		1270		Guglielmo VII degli Aleramici
	Beatrice of Castile and León (Beatrice di Castiglia e León)	Alfonso X of Castile and León (Anscarids)	5 November/6 December 1254	August 1271		after 1280		Guglielmo VII degli Aleramici
	Margaret of Savoy (Margherita di Savoia)	Amadeus V, Count of Savoy (Savoy)	1295	23 March 1296		9 March 1305 husband's death	1339	Giovanni I degli Aleramici

=== House of Paleologi ===
Picture	Name	Father	Birth	Marriage	Became Marchioness	Ceased to be Marchioness	Death	Spouse
	Argentina Spinola	Opicino Spinola, Doge of Genoa (Spinola)	1295	October 1307		1337		Teodoro I Paleologo
	Cécile of Comminges	Bernard VII, Count of Comminges (Comminges)	-	1337	24 April 1338 father-in-law's death	after 23 June 1354		Giovanni II Paleologo
	Isabella of Majorca (Isabella di Maiorca)	James III of Majorca (Barcelona)	1337	4 September 1358		19 March 1372 husband's death	1406	Giovanni II Paleologo
	Violante Visconti	Gian Galeazzo Visconti, Lord of Milan (Visconti)	1354	2 August 1377		16 December 1378 husband's death	November 1386	Ottone III Paleologo
	Argentina of Lunigiana (Argentina di Lunigiana)	Leonardo Malaspina, Marquess of Massa (Malaspina)	-	-	-	1387		Teodoro II Paleologo
	Joanna of Bar (Giovanna di Bar)	Robert I, Duke of Bar (Scarpone-Montbéliard)	-	8 September 1393		15 January 1402		Teodoro II Paleologo
	Blessed Margaret of Savoy (Beata Margherita di Savoia)	Amadeo, Prince of Achaea (Savoy)	21 June 1390	17 January 1403		16 April 1418 husband's death	23 November 1464	Teodoro II Paleologo
	Joanna of Savoy (Giovanna di Savoia)	Amadeus VII, Count of Savoy (Savoy)	16 July 1392	26 April 1411	16 April 1418 husband's accession	12 March 1445 husband's death	January 1460	Giovanni Giacomo Paleologo
	Marguerite of Savoy (Margherita di Savoia)	Louis, Duke of Savoy (Savoy)	1439	2 May/December 1458		19 January 1464 husband's death	9 March 1483	Giovanni IV Paleologo
	Marie de Foix (Maria di Foix)	Gaston IV, Count of Foix (Foix-Béarn-Bigorre)	1452	19 January 1465		1467		Guglielmo VIII Paleologo
	Isabella Maria Sforza (Elisabetta Maria Sforza)	Francesco I Sforza, Duke of Milan (Sforza)	10 June 1456	18 July 1469		1 September 1472		Guglielmo VIII Paleologo
	Bernardina of Brosse (Bernarda di Brosse)	Jean II de Brosse (Brosse)	1450	6 January 1474		27 February 1483 husband's death	17 February 1485	Guglielmo VIII Paleologo
	Helena of Brosse (Elena di Brosse)	Jean II de Brosse (Brosse)	1460	31 August 1483		1484		Bonifacio III Paleologo
	Maria of Serbia (Marija Branković)	Stefan III Branković, Despotes in Serbia (Branković)	1466	8 July 1485		31 January 1494 husband's death	27 August 1495	Bonifacio III Paleologo
	Anne of Alençon (Anna d'Alençon)	René, Duke of Alençon (Valois-Alençon)	30 October 1492	31 October 1508		4 October 1518 husband's death	18 October 1562	Guglielmo IX Paleologo
	Julia of Naples (Giulia di Napoli)	Frederick IV of Naples (Trastámara)	1492	21 April 1533		30 April 1533 husband's death	10 March 1542	Giovanni Giorgio Paleologo

Spanish occupation until 1536.

=== House of Gonzaga ===
In 1536 Charles V, Holy Roman Emperor granted the marquisate, despite competing claims from Savoy and from the Marquis of Saluzzo, to the Gonzagas. This was confirmed in 1559 by the Peace of Cateau-Cambrésis.

Picture	Name	Father	Birth	Marriage	Became Marchioness	Ceased to be Marchioness	Death	Spouse
	Margaret Palaeologina (Margherita Paleologa)	Guglielmo IX Paleologo (Paleologi)	11 August 1510	3 October 1531	1536 husband's accession	28 August 1540 husband's death	28 December 1566	Federico I Gonzaga
	Catherine of Austria (Caterina d'Austria)	Ferdinand I, Holy Roman Emperor (Habsburg)	15 September 1533	22 October 1549		22 February 1550 husband's death	28 February 1572	Francesco I Gonzaga
	Eleanor of Austria (Eleonora d'Austria)	Ferdinand I, Holy Roman Emperor (Habsburg)	2 November 1534	26 April 1561		1574; Marquisate raised to a Duchy	5 August 1594	Guglielmo X Gonzaga

== Duchess of Montferrat ==
=== House of Gonzaga ===
In 1574, Maximilian II, Holy Roman Emperor raised the Gonzaga marquis to a duke and the "march" became the Duchy of Montferrat.

Picture	Name	Father	Birth	Marriage	Became Duchess	Ceased to be Duchess	Death	Spouse
	Eleanor of Austria (Eleonora d'Austria)	Ferdinand I, Holy Roman Emperor (Habsburg)	2 November 1534	26 April 1561	1574; Marquisate raised to a Duchy	14 August 1587 husband's death	5 August 1594	Guglielmo X Gonzaga
	Eleonora de' Medici	Francesco I de' Medici, Grand Duke of Tuscany (Medici)	28 February 1567	29 April 1584	14 August 1587 husband's accession	9 September 1611		Vincenzo I Gonzaga
	Margaret of Savoy (Margherita di Savoia)	Charles Emmanuel I, Duke of Savoy (Savoy)	28 April 1589	19 February 1608	9 February 1612 husband's accession	22 December 1612 husband's death	26 June 1655	Francesco II Gonzaga
	Caterina de' Medici	Francesco I de' Medici, Grand Duke of Tuscany (Medici)	2 May 1593	16 February 1617		29 October 1626 husband's death	17 April 1629	Ferdinando I Gonzaga
	Isabella Gonzaga (Isabella Gonzaga)	Alfonso Gonzaga, Marquess of Novellara (Gonzaga)	1576	1616	29 October 1626 husband's accession	25 December 1627 husband's death	? 1627	Vincenzo II Gonzaga

=== House of Gonzaga-Nevers ===
Picture	Name	Father	Birth	Marriage	Became Duchess	Ceased to be Duchess	Death	Spouse
	Isabella Clara of Austria (Isabella Clara d'Austria)	Leopold V, Archduke of Austria (Habsburg)	12 August 1629	7 November 1649		14 August 1665 husband's death	24 February 1685	Carlo III Gonzaga
	Anna Isabella Gonzaga (Anna Isabella Gonzaga)	Ferrante III Gonzaga, Duke of Guastalla (Gonzaga)	1655	1670		11 August 1703		Carlo IV Gonzaga
	Suzanne Henriette of Lorraine (Susanna Enrichetta di Lorena)	Charles III, Duke of Elbeuf (Guise)	1 February 1686	8 November 1704		before 5 July 1708; Conquest by Dukes of Savoy	19 December 1710	Carlo IV Gonzaga

== See also ==
- List of Thessalonican consorts
- List of Mantuan consorts
