= Margaret Paleologa (1364–1420) =

Margaret
- Born: 1364; Casale Montferrato
- Died: 1420 (aged 56); Saragosa, Urgell
- Noble family: Palaeologus-Montferrat
- Spouse: Peter II, Count of Urgell
- Issue: James II, Count of Urgell
- Father: John II, Marquess of Montferrat
- Mother: Isabel of Majorca

Coat-of-arms of Margaret's husband, Peter II Count of Urgell.

Margaret (Italian: Margherita Paleologa; 1364 in Casale Monferrato – 1420 in Saragosa, Urgell) from the House of Palaeologus-Montferrat, was daughter of the marquess of Montferrat and lady of Acqui. By her marriage, she became countess of Urgell.

== Biography ==
She was daughter of John II (r. 1338–1372), Lord of Asti and Novara and imperial vicar, and Isabel of Majorca. Her father was son of Theodore I, marquess of Montferrat and Argentina Spinola; her mother was daughter of James III of Majorca and his first wife Constance of Aragon.

Margaret was the only daughter of her father; her siblings were the marquesses Secondotto (r. 1372–1378, John III (r. 1378–1381 and Theodore II (r. 1381–1418).

Her son James II was appointed by the king of Aragon as governor-general (viceroy), i.e. heir, but failed to succeed. His great-grandchild John II of Aviz became king of Portugal.

== Family and issue ==
Margaret married in 1375/6 to her mother's first cousin Peter II (1340-1408), count of Urgell, viscount of Àger, baron of Entença and Antillón, who ruled from 1347 to 1408. He was son of James I, Count of Urgell; Margaret was his second wife. They had issue:

- James II (1380–1433), Count of Urgell, ruled 1408–1413. In 1410, his father's cousin Martin of Aragon died and James II was the closest male relative, but the House of Trastámara, kings of Castile, managed to succeed in the kingdom of Aragon.

== Ancestry ==
Ancestors of Margaret Palaiologina

16. Michael VIII Palaiologos
8. Andronikos II Palaiologos
17. Theodora Doukaina Vatatzina
4. Theodore I, Marquess of Montferrat
18. William VII, Marquess of Montferrat
9. Irene of Montferrat
19. Beatrice of Castile
2. John II, Marquess of Montferrat
20. Sbaralia Spinola
10. Opicino Spinola
5. Argentina Spinola
22. Thomas I, Marquess of Saluzzo
11. Violante of Saluzzo
23. Luigia di Ceva
1. Margaret Palaiologina
24. James II of Majorca
12. Ferdinand of Majorca
25. Esclaramunda of Foix
6. James III of Majorca
26. Isnard de Sabran
13. Isabella of Sabran
27. Margaret of Villehardouin
3. Isabella of Majorca
28. James II of Aragon
14. Alfonso IV of Aragon
29. Blanche of Anjou
7. Constance of Aragon
30. Gombald d'Entença
15. Teresa d'Entença
31. Constance of Attillon

== Sources ==
- Alamán, Lucas; Manuel Orozco y Berra. Diccionario universal de historia y de geografía. p. 152.
- E. Michael Gerli, Samuel G. Armistead, ed. (2003). Medieval Iberia: an encyclopedia. Routledge.
