= Palaeologus-Montferrat =

Italian cadet branch of the former Byzantine ruling dynasty

Palaeologus-Montferrat Palaiologos, Paleologo
- Arms of the family, combining the arms of the House of Aleramici with the tetragrammatic cross of the Byzantine Palaiologoi
- Parent house: Palaiologos (agnatic); Aleramici (cognatic)
- Country: March of Montferrat
- Founded: 1306; 720 years ago
- Founder: Theodore Palaiologos
- Final ruler: John George Palaeologus
- Final head: Margaret Paleologa
- Titles: Marquis of Montferrat
- Traditions: Catholicism
- Dissolution: 1566; 460 years ago
- Deposition: 1533; 493 years ago

The House of Palaeologus-Montferrat or Palaiologos-Montferrat, or just Palaeologus or Paleologo, was an Italian noble family and a cadet branch of the Palaiologos dynasty, the last ruling family of the Byzantine Empire. The cadet branch was created in 1306 when Theodore Palaiologos, fourth son of Byzantine Emperor Andronikos II Palaiologos, inherited the March of Montferrat through his mother, and Andronikos II's second wife, Yolande of Montferrat.

The Aleramici, Yolande's house and the previous rulers of Montferrat, had ruled the Kingdom of Thessalonica, a crusader state established around the city of Thessalonica after the Fourth Crusade in 1204. Though the resurgent Byzantines had reconquered Thessalonica in 1224, the Aleramici family still retained claims to the title. Because Andronikos II was eager to establish himself as legitimate in the eyes of Western Europe, he married Yolande in an effort to formally unite the claims of her family with his own de facto rule of Thessalonica, avoiding the potential future threat of a pretender launching an invasion against the empire.

At the time of their marriage, Yolande was second-in-line to the throne of Montferrat, and when her brother, John I of Montferrat, died without children in 1305, rulership of Montferrat legitimately passed to Yolande and her children, Theodore being chosen to make the journey to Italy and establish himself there. Many of the more conservative parts of the Byzantine aristocracy feared that Theodore and his descendants would become 'latinized]]; fears that were realized once Theodore adopted Western customs and converted to Catholicism.

Although the Montferrat Palaiologoi continued to use typical Greek names, such as Theodore or Sophia, from time to time, and a handful of marquises had Byzantine aspirations, they tended to pay relatively little attention to events and affairs in the Eastern Mediterranean. The imperial branch of the Palaiologos family were displaced in 1453 through the Fall of Constantinople, but the Montferrat cadet branch continued to rule Montferrat for almost another century after that, being replaced by the House of Gonzaga in 1533 after the death of the last male member of the house, John George Palaeologus. The last female member, Margaret Paleologa, died in 1566, rendering the house extinct. Their descendants are still alive today through matrilineal descent in several Italian noble houses, such as the House of Savoy.

== History ==
=== Background ===
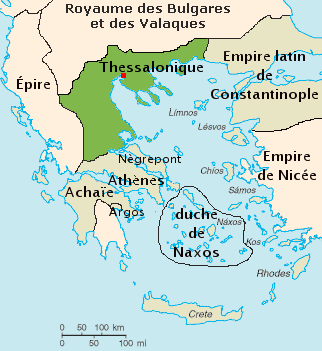
Map of the Kingdom of Thessalonica, ruled by the Aleramici family of Montferrat, at its foundation in 1204, in the aftermath of the Fourth Crusade

The ruling house of Montferrat, the Aleramici family, had been interconnected with the Byzantine Empire and its rulers for some time before the Palaiologoi gained Montferrat. In 1179, Emperor Manuel I Komnenos (r. 1143–1180) married his daughter Maria Komnene to Renier of Montferrat, who was granted the city of Thessalonica to rule as a pronoia. Because of this family connection, Renier's brother Boniface, a leading figure in the Fourth Crusade, could claim and conquer the "Kingdom of Thessalonica" in 1204. Though the Byzantines of Epirus retook Thessalonica in 1224, the Aleramici still retained their claims to the city and the kingdom they had created around it.

In 1284, Yolande of Montferrat, the daughter of the ruling Marquis of Montferrat, William VII, married Emperor Andronikos II Palaiologos of the Byzantine Empire (r. 1282–1328) and was given the titles associated with Thessalonica by her father as her dowry, though it is unclear if she was meant to possess them or if she was intended to transfer them to her husband, who actually ruled Thessalonica as part of his empire. Yolande retained her place in the Monferratian line of succession, second-in-line after her brother John, should he die without children. Upon her marriage to Andronikos, Yolande was given the Greek name Irene. The reason for Andronikos opting to marry Irene probably had to do with the emperor wishing to establish his legitimacy in regards to Western Europe. Although the Palaiologoi ruled the Byzantine Empire, which had controlled Greece and Anatolia since ancient times, many in Western Europe viewed them as usurpers, since they had supplanted the Catholic Latin Empire, established in 1204 after the Fourth Crusade. Through marriage alliances with western pretenders to the Latin Empire, or parts of it, Andronikos would have been able to achieve full recognition of his rule in the West. In addition to his own marriage to the pretender to Thessalonica, Andronikos also unsuccessfully attempted to marry his son, Michael IX Palaiologos, to Catherine of Courtenay, the recognized heir to the Latin Empire itself.

In his marriage negotiations with William VII, Andronikos paid William 6,000 livres génois, amounting to the revenue Andronikos and his father, Emperor Michael VIII Palaiologos (r. 1259–1282), had received from "the Kingdom of Thessalonica which belonged to the Marquis". Furthermore, Andronikos pledged 500 soldiers, stationed in Lombardy throughout William's lifetime, to aid the Marquis in his wars against the Angevins. The marriage between Andronikos and Irene had the unexpected result of giving the Byzantine imperial family the possibility of inheriting the throne of Montferrat.

=== Foundation ===
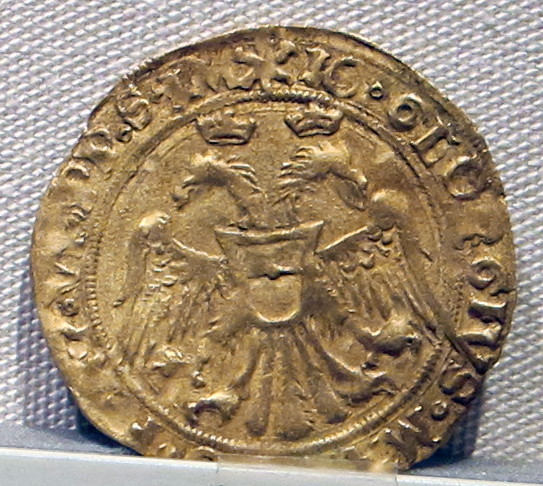
Gold coin of John George Palaeologus, the last Marquis of the Palaeologus-Montferrat line. The coin displays the double-headed eagle iconography of the Palaiologos dynasty.

In January 1305, John I of Montferrat, Irene's brother, died without children. John's will specified that in the absence of heirs of his own, Montferrat should go to Irene and her sons. In March, envoys left Montferrat to ask Irene, or one of her sons, to travel to Italy and claim their inheritance. After receiving the news, Irene and Andronikos clashed over which of their sons was to inherit Montferrat. The Emperor wanted to send their youngest son, Demetrios, but Irene preferred Theodore, who was older and from Thessalonica, and sent him instead. Irene had initially preferred the couple's oldest son John, also preferred by the envoys on account of primogeniture and his older age, but this suggestion was blocked by both the Emperor and the Patriarch of Constantinople, Athanasius I, since sending John, third-in-line to the Byzantine throne, to the West was seen as jeopardizing their own line of succession. Though the Byzantines in ages past would have welcomed the opportunity to send a member of the imperial family to establish a foothold in Italy, the Byzantines of the 14th century recognized that it was the Italians that would profit from a connection with the imperial family, and not the other way around. The possibility that the Italians would launch an attack on the empire as a result of the Monferrat inheritance was entertained by the Patriarch, who opposed the entire affair.

Late 15th-century coat of arms, as used by William IX Palaeologus

Theodore did not arrive in Italy until the late summer of 1306, aged 15. Theodore himself ascribed the delay to Andronikos not finding enough ships nor enough time to make the necessary preparations for the journey. Another likely reason was that the Marquis of Saluzzo, Manfred IV, had attacked Monferrat, claiming that John I's widow, Margarita, was pregnant and that since an heir would thus be produced, a Byzantine prince was unnecessary. Theodore was not sent to Monferrat until Manfred's claim was uncovered to be a lie. Before leaving Byzantium, Theodore also married Argentina Spinola, the daughter of Opicino Spinola, a merchant and one of the "Captains of the People" of Genoa. Theodore's fate was a shock to some of the more conservative members of the Byzantine aristocracy; not only had a young Byzantine prince, born in the purple, been sent to live among, and rule over, Latin barbarians, but he had also chosen to marry not only a commoner, but a Latin commoner. Theodore's marriage to Argentina might have been payment to Genoa for Genoese assistance against the Catalans in Andronikos II's wars.

Byzantine fears that Theodore would become "Latinized" were quickly realized. Theodore converted to Catholicism and on his occasional journeys to Constantinople startled the Byzantines with his Western customs and his shaven face. In the 1320s, Theodore was one of the most directly involved and influential figures in Andronikos II's negotiations and hopes for a union between the Orthodox and Catholic churches. One of Theodore's preserved literary works, a treatise on war and government, expresses western feudal practices and ideas and is notably missing contemporary Byzantine ideas. Throughout his reign, Theodore was mainly preoccupied with maintaining his position within the March of Montferrat.

=== 'Latinization' and attitude towards Byzantium ===
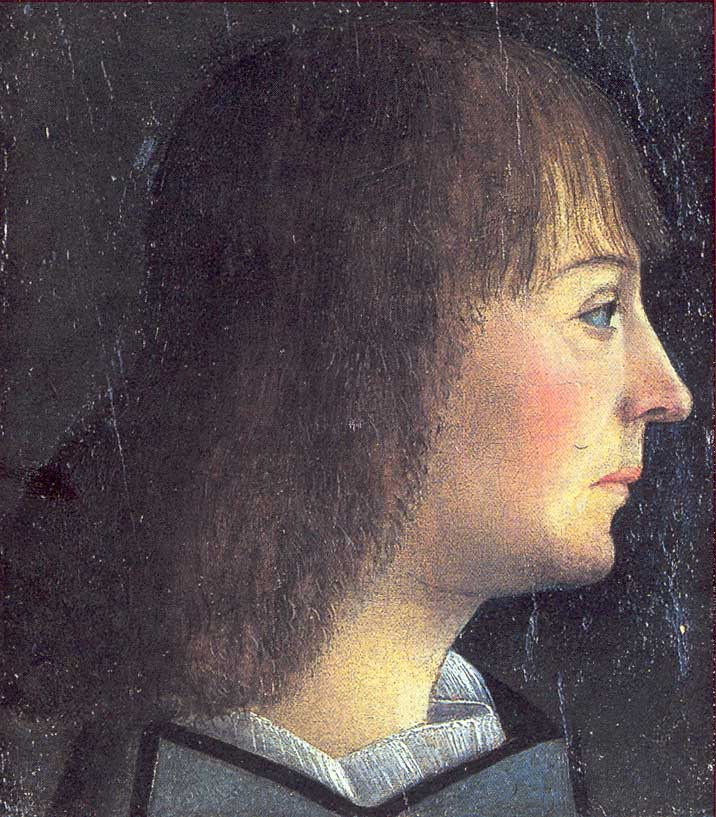
Portrait of William IX Palaeologus, Marquis of Montferrat 1494–1518

Theodore founded the Palaeologus-Montferrat cadet branch of the Palaiologos dynasty, fusing and subsuming the Aleramici lineage with a succession that derived from Byzantium and carried the name of the Palaiologan emperors. Theodore's family ruled Monferrat until the 16th century. Although the Palaiologoi of Montferrat were Latinized, there still had some ties to their homeland; notably reflected in several of them being given typically Greek names, such as Theodore and Sophia. Additionally, they held strong ties to Genoa. Though the Byzantines had seen Argentina Spinola as a mere commoner, her family held significant political power in Genoa. Theodore II of Montferrat, Theodore I's grandson, even managed to take control of the city in 1409, ruling there until 1413.

Theodore I's successor as Marquis of Montferrat, his son John II Palaeologus, attempted to take advantage of the Byzantine civil war of 1341–1347, between Andronikos II's great-grandson John V Palaiologos and John VI Kantakouzenos, in order to invade the empire and conquer Thessalonica. In his 1372 will, John II claimed that Andronikos II's deposition in 1328 by his grandson Andronikos III Palaiologos (John V's father) had been unlawful and thus disqualified Andronikos III and all his heirs from the legitimate line of succession to the throne of Byzantium. John II also pointed out that since Andronikos II had disinherited Andronikos III, John II was thus the rightful emperor as the only true heir to Andronikos II. John II even petitioned the Papacy to recognize his claims to Thessalonica and to the empire, and to help him conquer them. An expedition to "recover" these territories was never organized. Although John II's claims were theoretically inherited by his descendants, none of the marquises seriously pursued a policy of taking over the Byzantine Empire, most of them paying little attention to affairs in the East.

In 1420, Sophia of Montferrat, the great-granddaughter of Theodore I, was chosen by Emperor Manuel II Palaiologos and Pope Martin V to marry her distant relative, John VIII Palaiologos, then the heir to the Byzantine throne. Manuel II agreed to this marriage not because they were related, but because Sophia held connections to Montferrat and Genoa, valuable allies, and because she had been suggested by the Pope. Pope Martin V himself might have been interested in securing the allegiance of Montferrat by suggesting an imperial marriage. Their marriage was not a happy one, on account of John VIII finding Sophia unattractive, and Sophia left John VIII in 1426, returning to Italy. John remarried in the following year.

=== Extinction and descendants ===
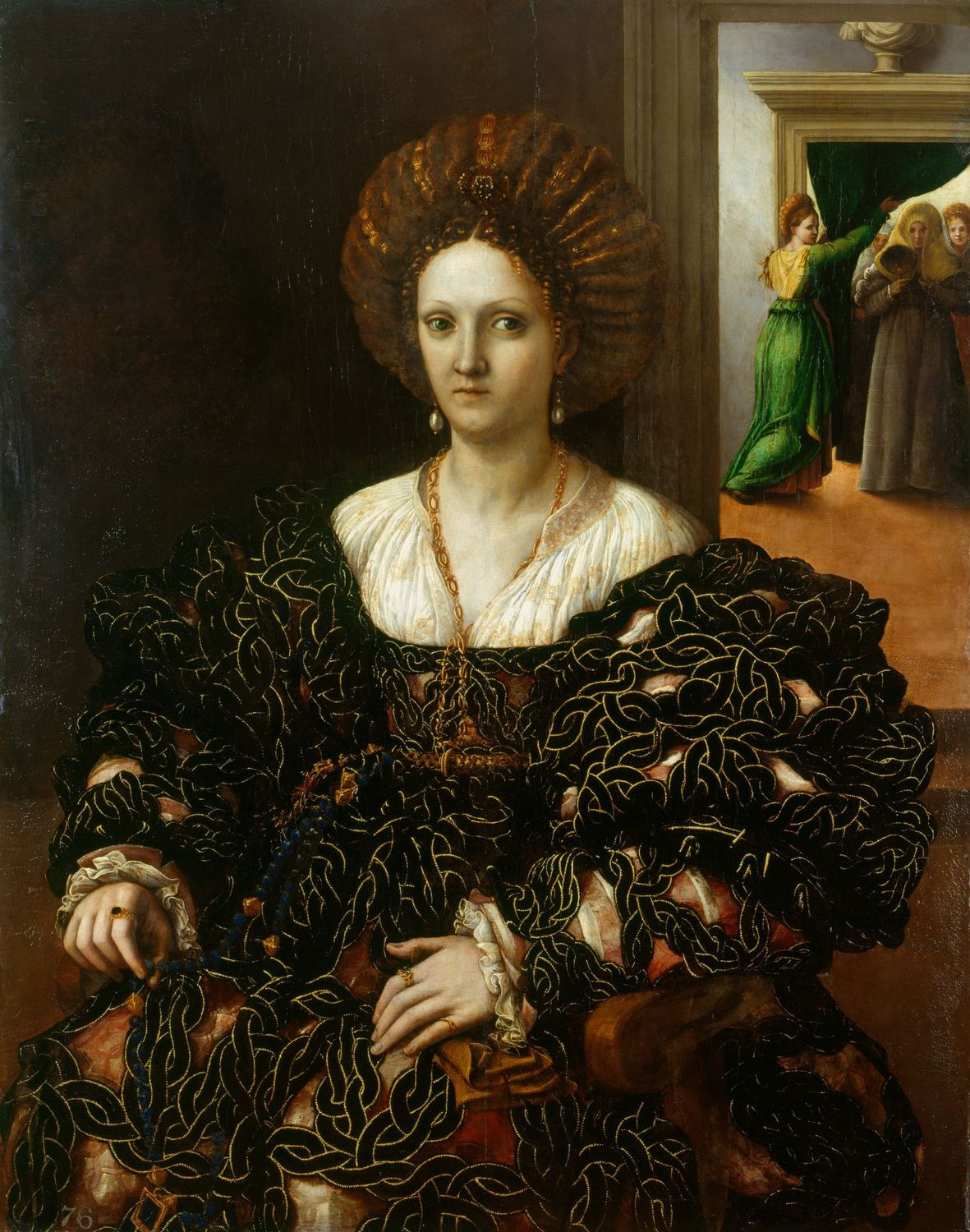
Portrait believed to depict Margaret Paleologa, the last living member of the Palaeologus-Montferrat family

The Palaeologus-Montferrat family repeatedly intermarried with the powerful House of Savoy. In 1330, Theodore I's daughter, Yolande Palaeologina of Montferrat, married Aymon, Count of Savoy, and in 1411, a daughter of Amadeus VII, Count of Savoy, Joanna, married John Jacob, Marquis of Montferrat. The marriage contract between Yolande and Aymon in 1330 specified that in the event of the extinction of the Palaeologus-Montferrat line, the House of Savoy was to inherit Montferrat. This contract must only have been a distant memory when the final Palaeologus Marquis, John George, Marquis of Montferrat, died in 1533. Though the then current Savoyard heir, Charles III, Duke of Savoy, made a claim to the title, the Montferrat territories were instead given to a rival contender, Federico II Gonzaga, Duke of Mantua, by Holy Roman Emperor Charles V. In 1708, the House of Savoy, through Victor Amadeus II of Sardinia, succeeded in claiming Montferrat, the acquisition of which was confirmed in 1713 through the Peace of Utrecht, which ended the War of the Spanish Succession. The House of Savoy, which ruled all of Italy 1861–1946, represents still-living descendants of the Palaeologus-Montferrat family.

Federico II Gonzaga, who had succeeded the Palaeologus-Montferrat family in 1533, was connected to the family by marriage, being the husband of Margaret Paleologa, niece of John George. Federico had married Margaret on 3 October 1531 with the explicit goal of acquiring Montferrat. With Margaret's death in 1566, the Palaeologus-Montferrat family became extinct. Her and Federico II's descendants, with the Gonzaga name, ruled Montferrat until they were supplanted by the House of Savoy.

The name "Montferrato-Paleologo" is recorded on the Greek island of Cephalonia until the 17th century, though the relations of these Montferrato-Paleologo to the branch ruling in Montferrat are unclear. According to Mallat (2007), descendants of this family survived on Cephalonia until modern times. A family of Paleologo in Taranto, relatives of the Paleologo in Cephalonia, also survived into the 17th century.

Though the Palaeologus-Montferrat family went extinct with the death of Margaret Paleologa, claims of male-line descent have been forwarded in modern times, particularly claims of descent from Flaminio, an illegitimate son of John George. According to some genealogies, Flaminio left extensive lineages of descendants, such as the Paleologo-Oriundi family, which claims descent from Teodoro, son of Flaminio. The veracity of such lines of descent is disputed. Even if descent was proven, descendants of Flaminio would not be considered true members of the Palaeologus-Montferrat family, or the Palaiologos dynasty itself, on account of descent through an illegitimate son.

== Family tree ==
In order to conserve space, the family tree only displays people of male-line descent who survived until adulthood. Marquises are indicated with bold text and women are indicated with italics. Dotted lines indicate illegitimate children. The illegitimate children of William VIII and their descendants follow Mallat (2007).

William VII of Montferrat; 1240–1292	Michael VIII Palaiologos; 1224–1282
John I c.1275–1305	Yolanda-Eirene	Andronikos II Palaiologos; 1259–1332	Anna of Hungary
Michael IX Palaiologos; 1277–1320
Theodore I c. 1290–1338	Andronikos III Palaiologos; 1297–1341
Yolande; 1318–1342	John II; 1321–1372	John V Palaiologos; 1332–1391
Secondotto; 1358/61–1378	John III c. 1362–1381	Theodore II; 1364–1418	William ?–1400	Margaret; 1364–1420	Manuel II Palaiologos; 1350–1425
John Jacob; 1395–1445	Sophia ?–1434	John VIII Palaiologos; 1392–1448
John IV; 1413–1464	Amadea; 1418–1440	Isabella c. 1419–1475	William VIII; 1422–1483	Boniface III; 1424–1494	Theodoro; 1425–1481
Elena Margherita; 1459–1496	Sara; 1462–1503	Scipione; 1463–1485	Blanche; 1472–1519	Giovanna; 1473–1490	Lucrezia ?–1519	Annibale ?–1523	William IX; 1486–1518	Francesca ?–1561	John George; 1488–1533
Alessandro	Cesare ?–after 1563	Maria; 1509–1530	Margaret; 1510–1566	Boniface IV; 1512–1530	Flaminio; 1518–1571
Fabrizio	Pantasileia	Camilla	Angela

The family tree below displays the lineage of the Paleologo in Taranto and the Montferrato-Paleologo in Cephalonia (Nicolo and his descendants), per Mallat (2007), their relations to the main branch above are unclear.

Giorgio fl. 1573
Cristoforo	Nicolo
Fulvio; 1577–?	Adriano; 1578–?	Antonio; 1579–?	Silvio; 1581–?	Raffaele; 1584–?	Giovanni Maria
Beatrice; 1618–?	Ercole Agostino; 1620–?	Francesco Antonio; 1624–?	Matteo; 1570–?
(Descendants)
