= Yolande Palaeologina of Montferrat =

Countess of Savoy (1318–1342)

Yolande
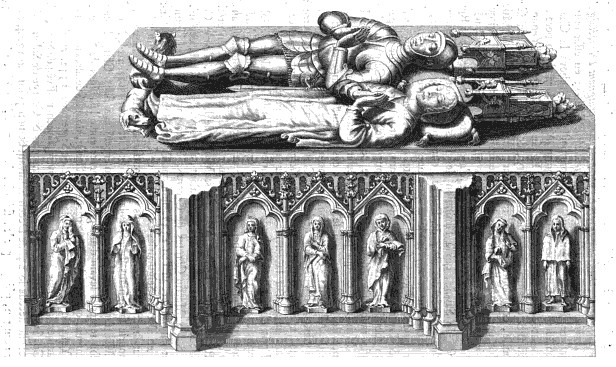
- Tomb of Aimone and Yolande

Countess of Savoy
- Tenure: 1 May 1330 – 24 December 1342
- Born: June 1318; Moncalvo
- Died: 24 December 1342 (aged 23–24); Chambery
- Burial: Hautecombe Abbey
- Spouse: Aimone, Count of Savoy
- Issue: Amadeus VI, Count of Savoy; Bianca, Lady of Milan
- House: Palaeologus-Montferrat
- Father: Theodore I, Marquess of Montferrat
- Mother: Argentina Spinola

Yolande Palaiologina or Violant (Moncalvo, June 1318 – Chambery, 24 December 1342) was the Countess consort of Savoy by marriage to Aimone, Count of Savoy. She was the daughter of Theodore I, Marquess of Montferrat, and Argentina Spinola (1303-1356), a Genoese lady, daughter of Opicino Spinola. She received the name Yolande from her paternal grandmother Irene of Montferrat.

== Life ==
On 1 May 1330 Yolande married Aimone, Count of Savoy; from her marriage she became countess of Savoy, Aosta and Moriana. Her marriage was arranged to seal the newly found peace between her family and the counts of Savoy, and on the basis that the latter would succeed to Montferrat in case of extinction in the male line of the Palaeologus-Montferrat family. According also to this act of inheritance in Montferrat, when the male line died out of the House of Palaeologus-Montferrat with the death of Boniface IV of Montferrat two centuries later, Charles III, Duke of Savoy, laid claim to Montferrat through Yolande his great-great-great-great grandmother. However it was claimed by Charles V, Holy Roman Emperor.

After failing to produce a child for the count in the first few years of marriage, she went to the shrine of the Virgin Mary at Bourg-en-Bresse, which was considered at the time to help marriages become fruitful. Not long after, she conceived a son, Amadeus. She returned to the shrine after his birth, and was pleased to then conceive a daughter.

Yolande died whilst giving birth to her son Louis on 24 December 1342, and she was buried in a chapel at Hautecombe Abbey.

== Issue ==
They had:

1. Amadeus VI (Amadeo VI) (1334–1383)
2. Bianca (1336–1388), married in 1350 to Galeazzo II Visconti, Lord of Milan
3. John (1338–1345), died young
4. Catherine (1341), died young
5. Louis (b. 24 December 1342), died young

== Sources ==
- Cox, Eugene L. (1967). The Green Count of Savoy. Princeton, New Jersey: Princeton University Press. LCCN 67-11030.
- Knowles, Christine (1983). Les Enseignements de Theodore Paleologue (in French). The Modern Humanities Research Association.
- Williams, George L. (2004). Papal Genealogy: The Families and Descendants of the Popes. McFarland & Company, Inc.

Preceded by Bianca of Burgundy	Countess of Savoy; 1330–1342	Succeeded by Bonne of Bourbon
