= Bianca of Savoy =

Lady of Milan (1337–1387)

Bianca

Lady of Milan
- Tenure: 1350–1378
- Born: 1337
- Died: 31 December 1387 (aged 49–50); Pavia
- Spouse: Galeazzo II Visconti
- Issue: Gian Galeazzo Visconti; Maria Visconti; Violante Visconti
Names
- Bianca Marie di Savoia
- House: Savoy
- Father: Aimone, Count of Savoy
- Mother: Yolande Palaeologina of Montferrat

Bianca of Savoy (1337– Pavia, 31 December 1387) was Lady of Milan by marriage to Galeazzo II Visconti.

== Early life ==
Bianca was the only surviving daughter of Aimone, Count of Savoy and Yolande Palaeologina of Montferrat, herself the daughter of Theodore I, Marquess of Montferrat (1291–1338) and Genoese noblewoman Argentina Hispanola.

When Bianca was six years old she lost her mother Yolande, who died giving birth on 24 December 1342 to her younger brother Louis, who died in childhood. Six months later on 22 June 1343 her father, Aimone died.

In 1345, negotiations were started for her to marry a son of Edward III of England, to renew the relationship between Savoy and England.

Bianca was raised in the castle of the Counts of Savoy on the shores of Lake Bourget. In 1345 tragedy struck when Bianca's younger brother John died. This left only one son and heir to Savoy, Bianca's older brother Amadeus VI, the "Green Count" of Savoy.

== Lady of Milan ==
In an attempt to curb the expansionist policies of Bianca's uncle John II, Marquess of Montferrat, an alliance was established on the 22 October 1349 between Amadeus VI, Count of Savoy and Giovanni Visconti of Milan. In the agreements, a marriage was arranged between Bianca and Giovanni's nephew Galeazzo II Visconti.

On 28 September 1350 at Rivoli, Bianca and Galeazzo were married, he was sixteen years her senior. Only weeks after the marriage in October 1350, Galeazzo was asked by his uncle to seize the city of Bologna but his fragile health forced him to leave the conquest.

After moving to Bologna in 1351 their first child was born, Gian Galeazzo Visconti, then in 1352 a daughter, Maria (who died aged ten in April 1362) and then another daughter Violante in 1354.

In 1360 Galeazzo was appointed Imperial vicar by Charles IV, Holy Roman Emperor and Pavia fell under the domination of the Visconti family.

Bianca followed her husband to Pavia, where he built the Visconti Castle. There she continued her education and cultivated relationships with illustrious figures, including Francesco Petrarca, founder of the Visconti Library, who brought the first copies of Divine Comedy to the court.

When war broke out between Milan and her uncle John II, Bianca's brother, Count Amadeus VI, fought on John's side. Bianca used all available means to avert quarrels between him and her husband. The conflict ended with John ll ceding the occupied areas of Lombardy and Piedmont.

== Later life ==
When the state of her husband's health deteriorated, the couple relocated to Corte nova. Galeazzo died in 1378. Bianca founded the Franciscan monastery of Santa Chiara. In the last years of life, Bianca spent time raising her granddaughter, Valentina, whom she taught French and German.

In 1385, together with her son, she participated in a conspiracy against Bernabò Visconti. The conspiracy succeeded, and Bernabò died half a year later in captivity. Bianca's son Gian Galeazzo was then the sole ruler of Milan. In 1386, Violante died. Bianca took the death of her daughter very badly.

Bianca died on 31 December 1387. She was buried at Chiesa di Santa Chiara la Reale in Pavia.

== Issue ==
Bianca and Galeazzo had:

1. Gian Galeazzo (November 1351 – 3 September 1402), succeeded his father as Lord of Milan. Married firstly to Isabella of France and secondly to Caterina Visconti.
2. Maria (1352 – April 1362), betrothed to the future Secondotto, Marquess of Montferrat with Asti as her dowry; she died before the wedding took place.
3. Violante (1354 – November 1386), married firstly to Lionel of Antwerp, 1st Duke of Clarence, secondly to Secondotto, Marquess of Montferrat and thirdly to Lodovico Visconti.

== Sources ==
- Cox, Eugene L. (1967). The Green Count of Savoy. Princeton, New Jersey: Princeton University Press. LCCN 67-11030.
- Knowles, Christine (1983). Les Enseignements de Theodore Paleologue (in French). The Modern Humanities Research Association.
- de Mesquita, D. M. Bueno (1941). Giangaleazzo Visconti. Cambridge University Press.
- Welch, Evelyn (2010). "Patron, Artists, and Audiences in Renaissance Milan, 1300-1600". In Rosenberg, Charles M. (ed.). The Court Cities of Northern Italy: Milan, Parma, Piacenza, Mantua, Ferrara, Bologna, Urbino, Pesaro, and Rimini. Cambridge University Press.

Preceded by Egidiola Gonzaga	Lady of Milan; 1350–1378	Succeeded by Beatrice Regina della Scala
