= John II of Montferrat =

Margrave of Montferrat from 1338 (1321–1372)

John II, Marquis of Montferrat

Marquis of Montferrat
- Reign: 1338–1372
- Predecessor: Theodore I Palaiologos
- Successor: Otto III Palaiologos
- Born: 5 February 1321
- Died: 19 March 1372 (aged 51); Volpiano
- Noble family: Palaeologus-Montferrat
- Spouse: Isabel of Majorca
- Issue: Secondotto, Marquis of Montferrat; John III, Marquis of Montferrat; Theodore II, Marquis of Montferrat; Margaret; William
- Father: Theodore I of Montferrat
- Mother: Argentina Spinola

John II Palaeologus (5 February 1321 – 19 March 1372) was the Margrave of Montferrat from 1338.

== Career ==
John was the son of Theodore I of Montferrat, with whom he was associated in the government from 1336. He had great fortune in extending the boundaries of the margraviate against his neighbours. With the help of his cousin Otto of Brunswick-Grubenhagen, John turned against the Angevins of Naples, who had large possessions in Piedmont and Savoy. In 1338 at the age of 17, he succeeded his father as the ruler of Montferrat.

In 1343, when Robert, King of Naples died and his young granddaughter Joanna I took the crown, John took the opportunity to expand his control in northern Italy. By 1344, he had conquered Alessandria, Asti, Tortona, Bra and Alba. On 22 April 1345, at the Battle of Gamenario, he defeated the Angevine vicar Reforza d'Angoult, who died in the battle. With the tacit support of Luchino Visconti, John occupied Alba, Bra, Valenza and, in 1348, Cuneo. His power grew in 1355 when he accompanied the Emperor Charles IV through Italy. At that time he received the cities of Cherasco, Novara and Pavia. A year later John was even successful in taking Asti from the Visconti.

By a marriage to the last titular Queen of Majorca, Isabella, he lost the support of the emperor and had to fend off attacks from imperial and Visconti troops. This conflict concluded with restitution of territory around Pavia occupied by John to the Visconti in exchange for Visconti possessions in the area of Asti. John lost many vassals to the Visconti. In his will of 1372, John left the tutelage of his children to Otto of Brunswick and Amadeus VI of Savoy. He had four sons, three of whom succeeded him in turn, and a daughter with his wife Isabella (Secondotto, John III, Theodore II, Margaret and William). John died at Volpiano near Turin soon after composing his testament and was buried at Chivasso.

== Sources ==
- Cox, Eugene L. (1967). The Green Count of Savoy. Princeton, New Jersey: Princeton University Press. LCCN 67-11030.
- Ferraris, Carlo (2006). "History of Monferrato, the origins, the marquisate, the duchy". Wayback Machine (in Italian). Internet Archive. Archived from the original on 26 September 2007.
- Hillgarth, J. N., ed. (1980). Pere III of Catalonia: Chronicle, Part 1. Translated by Hillgarth, Mary. Pontifical Institute of Medieval Studies.

John II of Montferrat Palaeologus-Montferrat Cadet branch of the Palaiologos dynasty Born: 5 February 1321 Died: 19 March 1372
Regnal titles
Preceded by Theodore I	Margrave of Montferrat; 1338–1372	Succeeded by Otto III
