= John III of Montferrat =

Margrave of Montferrat

John III, Marquis of Montferrat

Marquis of Montferrat
- Reign: 1378–1381
- Predecessor: Otto III Palaiologos
- Successor: Theodore II Palaiologos
- Born: c. 1362
- Died: 25 August 1381
- Noble family: Palaeologus-Montferrat
- Father: John II, Marquis of Montferrat
- Mother: Isabella of Majorca

John III Palaeologus (c. 1362 – 25 August 1381) was the Margrave of Montferrat from 1378 to his death. He was the second son of John II of Montferrat and Isabella of Majorca and brother and successor of Secondotto. On 3 January 1379, John III was installed as margrave under the regency of his uncle Otto, Duke of Brunswick-Grubenhagen.

Desirous of avenging his brother's death and recuperating the territory lost in the aftermath of Secondotto's retreat, John declared war on the Visconti of Milan, but was forced to sign a peace before fighting had begun, under the pressure of the Antipope Clement VII of Avignon, who wished to have Otto of Brunswick at his court. Otto consequently signed the treaty and confirmed the borders of the margraviate during his absence. In order to guarantee the survival of the margraviate, Otto placed it under the protection of the Kingdom of France.

Later, John followed Otto to the court of the Kingdom of Naples, but during his absence troubles arose. When Charles III was declared King of Naples and Joan I successively fled, John and Otto found themselves fully immersed in the war over the Neapolitan succession and unable to return to Montferrat. On 25 August 1381, they were involved in a battle in which Otto was captured and the young John slain. He was succeeded by his younger brother Theodore II, Marquis of Montferrat.

== Ancestry ==
Ancestors of John III of Montferrat

16. Michael VIII Palaiologos
8. Andronikos II Palaiologos
17. Theodora Doukaina Vatatzina
4. Theodore I, Marquis of Montferrat
18. William VII, Marquis of Montferrat
9. Irene of Montferrat
19. Beatrice of Castile
2. John II, Marquis of Montferrat
20. Corrado Spinola
10. Opicino Spinola
21. Argentina Fieschi
5. Argentina Spinola
22. Thomas I, Marquis of Saluzzo
11. Violante of Saluzzo
23. Aloisia di Ceva
1. John III, Marquis of Montferrat
24. James II of Majorca
12. Ferdinand of Majorca
25. Esclaramunda of Foix
6. James III of Majorca
26. Isnard of Sabran
13. Isabella of Sabran
27. Margaret of Villehardouin
3. Isabella of Majorca
28. James II of Aragon
14. Alfonso IV of Aragon
29. Blanche of Anjou
7. Constance of Aragon
30. Gombau d'Entença
15. Teresa d'Entença
31. Constança d'Antillón

== Sources ==
- Dizionario Biografico degli Italiani LV Ginammi – Giovanni da Crema. Caravale, Mario (ed). Rome, 2000.

Preceded by Otto III	Margrave of Montferrat; 1378–1381	Succeeded by Theodore II
