= Sophia of Montferrat =

Empress consort of the Byzantine Empire
- Tenure: 1421–1426
- Died: 1434
- Spouse: John VIII Palaiologos
- House: Palaeologus-Montferrat
- Father: Theodore II of Montferrat
- Mother: Joanna of Bar

Sophia of Montferrat (or Sophia Palaiologina, Greek: Σοφία Παλαιολογίνα; died 21 August 1434) was a Byzantine empress by marriage to John VIII Palaiologos.

== Life ==
Sophia was a daughter of Theodore II Palaiologos, Marquess of Montferrat, and his second wife, Joanna of Bar. Through her father, Sophia was a relative of the reigning Byzantine Palaiologi dynasty.

On 26 January 1404, Sophia was betrothed to Filippo Maria Visconti. He was a son of Gian Galeazzo Visconti, Duke of Milan and his second wife Caterina Visconti. The marriage contract was eventually broken.

On 19 January 1421, Sophia was married to John VIII Palaiologos. He was the eldest surviving son of Manuel II Palaiologos and Helena Dragaš. He was at the time co-ruler with his father. The marriage was recorded by both Doukas and George Sphrantzes in their respective chronicles. Sphrantzes records Hagia Sophia as its location.

Manuel had sent Nicholas Eudaimonoioannes as ambassador to the Council of Constance while seeking Papal permission for the marriage, as the issue was the conversion of the Roman Catholic bride to the Eastern Orthodox Church. The permission was granted by Pope Martin V.

Apparently although Sophia was a particularly pious individual, unfortunately for her marriage, she was also considered unattractive by the standards of her time, described by Doukas as "Lent in front and Easter behind". John VIII, not content in his marriage, made every effort to avoid her, and as a result, Sophia spent much of her time in Constantinople isolated from her husband.

On 21 July 1425, Manuel II died and John VIII succeeded him. Sophia replaced her mother-in-law as senior empress. However, Sphrantzes records that in August 1426 Sophia "fled the City [Constantinople] and returned to her homeland", and that a little more than a year later John VIII made Maria of Trebizond his wife. Sophia never remarried and died eight years later.

== Sources ==
- Doukas, Historia Bizantina
- George Sphrantzes, Chronicle
- Nicol, D.M., The Last Centuries of Byzantium 1261-1453 (Cambridge University Press, 1993)
- Vasiliev, A.A., History of the Byzantine Empire, 324-1453 (University of Wisconsin Press, 1958)

Sophia of Montferrat Palaeologus-Montferrat Cadet branch of the Palaiologos dynasty Born: ? Died: 1434
Royal titles
Preceded by Helena Dragaš	Byzantine Empress consort 1421–1426	Succeeded by Maria of Trebizond
