= Secondotto =

Margrave of Montferrat (1372-1378)

Secondotto, Marquis of Montferrat

Marquis of Montferrat
- Reign: 1372–1378
- Predecessor: John II Palaiologos
- Successor: John III Palaiologos
- Born: 1358/61
- Died: 16 December 1378
- Noble family: Palaeologus-Montferrat
- Spouse: Violante Visconti (m. 1377)
- Father: John II, Marquis of Montferrat
- Mother: Isabella of Majorca

Secondotto Palaeologus (also Otho or Ottone; died 16 December 1378) was the Margrave of Montferrat from 1372 to his death, the third of the House of Palaeologus-Montferrat. His name Secondotto may derive from his being the second Otto to rule Montferrat in his own right, though he would really be Otto III. More probably it is derived from Saint Secundus (San Secondo in Italian), the patron saint of Asti, which his father treated as the capital of the marquisate. The Otto may be in honour of Otto, Duke of Brunswick-Grubenhagen, a close ally of his father.

He was born around 1360 as the first son of John II and Isabella of Majorca. In December 1361, as part of a peace deal made between John II and Galeazzo II Visconti, co-lord of Milan, he was betrothed to the latter's four-year-old daughter Maria. The city of Asti, on which Galeazzo had also had designs, was to count as part of Maria's dowry, and Montferrat would be allowed to retain control of it. The peace was short-lived, however, as Maria died in the May of the following year.

He succeeded as a child of around 12, and ruled originally under the co-regency of his uncle Otto, Duke of Brunswick-Grubenhagen, and Amadeus VI of Savoy. His father's will had stipulated that he should remain under his uncle's tutelage until the age of 25; however Otto left for Naples in 1376 to marry Queen Joan I.

Weak and inept, Secondotto could not carry the weight of government which devolved on his shoulders with the absence of his uncle. Secondotto thus decided to marry Violante (2 August 1377), the daughter of Galeazzo II Visconti, and widow of Lionel of Antwerp, 1st Duke of Clarence, and affirm an alliance with that family against the House of Savoy, Piedmont and Achaea.

When Otto of Brunswick's brother attacked and seized Asti, Secondotto called in the aid of his father-in-law, who, with a huge force, retook Asti and maintained it under Milanese control. Secondotto realised at that juncture the danger of his Milanese alliance, but by then it was too late. He gathered a force and led it against the Milanese troops and was defeated. Probably out of fear, he retreated to an unknown destination. He died at Langhirano in the vicinity of Parma in obscure circumstances: he may simply have been the loser in a brawl (he was famously ill-tempered and violent), or he may have been assassinated by an agent of the Visconti. His body was carried to Parma and buried before the high altar of the cathedral.

When his uncle received news of his death, he returned at once to the margraviate to handle the succession. He placed Secondotto's brother John III on the Montferrat throne. Despite the involvement of Emperor-elect Wenceslaus, the negotiations which Otto opened with Gian Galeazzo over the recovery of Asti were fruitless.

== Ancestry ==
Ancestors of Secondotto

16. Michael VIII Palaiologos
8. Andronikos II Palaiologos
17. Theodora Doukaina Vatatzina
4. Theodore I, Marquis of Montferrat
18. William VII, Marquis of Montferrat
9. Irene of Montferrat
19. Beatrice of Castile
2. John II, Marquis of Montferrat
20. Sbaralia Spinola
10. Opicino Spinola
5. Argentina Spinola
22. Thomas I, Marquis of Saluzzo
11. Violante of Saluzzo
23. Luigia di Ceva
1. Secondotto, Marquis of Montferrat
24. James II of Majorca
12. Ferdinand of Majorca
25. Esclaramunda of Foix
6. James III of Majorca
26. Isnard de Sabran
13. Isabelle de Sabran
27. Margaret of Villehardouin
3. Isabella of Majorca
28. James II of Aragon
14. Alfonso IV of Aragon
29. Blanche of Anjou
7. Constance of Aragon
30. Gombald d'Entença
15. Teresa d'Entença
31. Constance of Attillon

== Notes ==
| Preceded by John II | Margrave of Montferrat; 1372–1378 | Succeeded by John III |
