= Isabella Gonzaga =

Italian aristocrat

- Lady consort of San Martino dall'Argine; Duchess consort of Mantua and Montferrat
- Born: 1576
- Died: 1630 (aged 53–54)
- Noble family: House of Gonzaga
- Spouses: Ferrante Gonzaga, Lord of San Martino dall'Argine; Vincenzo II Gonzaga, Duke of Mantua
- Father: Alfonso I Gonzaga, Count of Novellara
- Mother: Vittoria di Capua

Isabella Gonzaga (Italian: Isabella Gonzaga di Novellara; 1576 – 1630), was an Italian aristocrat. She was Lady Consort of San Martino dall'Argine by marriage to Ferrante Gonzaga, Lord of San Martino dall'Argine, and Duchess consort of Mantua and Montferrat by marriage to Vincenzo II Gonzaga, Duke of Mantua. She served as regent of San Martino dall'Argine during the minority of her son Scipione between 1605 and 1613.

Considered one of the most beautiful women of her time, after the death of her first husband, she was regent of San Martino all’Argine, Isola Dovarese, Rivarolo and Commessaggio from 1605 to 1613, due to the fact that her eldest son was still a minor. Her disastrous second marriage to a distant cousin resulted in an accusation of witchcraft and an Inquisition process initiated at the request of her second husband's relatives, including his brother, Ferdinando I, which culminated in her complete rehabilitation. She played a fatal role in the extinction of the main branch of the House of Gonzaga, which initiated the beginning of the War of the Mantuan Succession.

== Life ==
=== Early life ===
Born in Novellara in 1576, Isabella was the eighth of thirteen children of Alfonso I Gonzaga, Count of Novellara and Bagnolo and Vittoria di Capua, a member of one of the richest and most powerful families in the Kingdom of Naples.

In 1594, Isabella married Ferrante Gonzaga, cadet member of the Gonzaga branch of Sabionetta-Bozzolo, Lord of San Martino all’Argine, Isola Dovarese, Rivarolo and Commessaggio and General of the Army of the Kingdom of Spain. They had seven (or eight) children.

=== Regent of San Martino all’Argine ===
In February 1605, Isabella's husband died. Because her oldest son was still a minor, she became regent of his domains, which included the Lordships of San Martino all’Argine, Isola Dovarese, Rivarolo and Commessaggio. In 1609, she also became the regent of the Principality of Bozzolo, the Lordship of Rivarolo di Fuori and the County of Pomponesco when her still underage son inherited these domains from his paternal uncle, Giulio Cesare Gonzaga. In historiography, the period of Isabella's regency is assessed by contemporaries as a positive one. Among her achievements were the establishment of an archive and a public notary chamber, which made it possible to improve the judicial system. Thanks to Isabella's actions, feuds under her government quickly coped with the consequences of the devastating flood of 1609.

While being deeply involved in the government of her eldest son's domains, Isabella also worked to ensure the futures of her younger children: Alfonso entered the service of an influential relative, Charles III, Duke of Nevers and Rethel (who later became in Duke of Mantua and Monferrato), from whom he received the title of Marquis of Pomaro. Carlo followed a church career and after studying at the University of Salamanca, took his vows as a monk and headed the Abbey of Lucedio. Luigi, Camillo, Annibale and Federigo all followed a military career and rose to high ranks. Her only daughter and namesake, Isabella, became a nun. In 1613, her oldest son, Scipione, finally attained his legal majority and took over the government of his domains, after which Isabella retired to San Martino, near Mantua.

=== Duchess consort of Mantua ===
In 1615, Cardinal Vincenzo Gonzaga —younger brother of Ferdinando I, Duke of Mantua and Monferrat— settled in the castle of Gazzuolo near San Martino. Despite the education and upbringing received from the Jesuits, the 21-year-old prince exhibited very dissolute behavior, for which he was removed from the Ducal court. When he learned that a middle-aged cousin once considered to be one of the first Italian beauties lived close to him, he decided to pay her a visit: it turned out that the 39-years-old Isabella, mother of eight children, was still beautiful and seductive. Vincenzo fell in love with her, but she refused his advances; then he proposed to her. In August 1616, they secretly married in the chapel of the San Martino palace. Vincenzo asked Pope Paul V for his release from his ecclesiastical vows. On 5 September of that year, his renouncement of the cardinalate received an official approval.

Ferdinando I was against this wedding, as he expected to influence through his younger brother's ecclesiastical status the policy of the Holy See in favor of the House of Gonzaga. The Duke turned to the Bishop of Mantua with a request to declare the marriage invalid, in order to return Vincenzo to the cardinalate; his position was shared by his wife Catherine de' Medici, who even tried to convince her mother Christina of Lorraine to obtain the support of the Grand Duchy of Tuscany in this matter. At first Vincenzo desperately resisted, but when he was banished to Goito and deprived of a number of material advantages, he broke down, and in December 1616 agreed with his older brother's demands to have his marriage to Isabella annulled.

Isabella was kept under surveillance for some time in Gazzuolo, but when it was confirmed that she wasn't pregnant, she was allowed to return to San Martino. However, the annulment of her marriage with Vincenzo turned out to be very difficult. Ferdinando I, using the help of his wife's cousin, Queen Marie of France, received the conclusion of the Sorbonne professors about the possible annulment of the marriage because of the close relationship of the couple; however, this wasn't enough. In Mantua itself, members of the Sabionetta and Novellara branches of the House of Gonzaga spoke out against the divorce.

Ferdinando I, childless in his marriage, understood that his younger brother was his heir, and wanted Vincenzo to marry soon to secure the survival of the dynasty; so, after an unsuccessful attempt to poison Isabella, the Duke accused her of witchcraft. The accusations provoked the beginning of the inquisition process, which was opened in the diocese of Mantua in 1622. There were supposed "witnesses" who said that they saw the Dowager Lady of San Martino all’Argine using magical potions. Isabella soon understood that if she went through a witch trial in Mantua, she would likely have no chance to save her life, especially when the accusation of witchcraft was supported by her husband. In 1623, she fled to Rome and appealed her case to the Supreme Inquisition. Thus, a new process was initiated, which was approved by the new Pope Urban VIII. Ferdinando I vainly insisted on conducting the inquisition process in Mantua. Isabella, at the insistence of the Duke, was imprisoned in the Castel Sant'Angelo in Rome. But soon, after a thorough investigation, she was cleared of all charges of witchcraft. All the "witnesses" were summoned to Rome, and once there, they recanted their testimonies. During January and May 1624, she was fully rehabilitated. The next attempt of the Duke and her husband to kill her, using hired killers, also failed.

In October 1626, Vincenzo became the new Duke of Mantua and Montferrat, under the name of Vincenzo II. Although the couple lived separately, they were still legally married, so Isabella was given the title of Duchess consort of Mantua and Montferrat. This news reached her in Rome. In April 1627, the Holy See confirmed the validity of the marriage of Isabella and Vincenzo II. In addition, she raised the issue of material compensation for damages caused by her husband and his relatives, as well as her recognition as Duchess. In December 1627, Isabella was widowed for the second time. With the death of her childless husband, the main line of the House of Gonzaga became extinct, and the War of the Mantuan Succession began.

== Issue ==
She had seven (or eight) children with Ferrante Gonzaga di Bozzolo:

- Scipione (1595 – Bozzolo, 12 May 1670), Lord of San Martino all’Argine, Isola Dovarese, Rivarolo and Commessaggio from 1605, 2nd Prince of Bozzolo (from 23 June 1609), Marquis of Ostiano, titular Duke of Sabbioneta (from 1636), Marquis d’Incisa during 1652–1669 (when the domain was sold to Trotti Bentivoglio) married Maria Anna Mattei dei Principi di Paganica (d. 1658) and had issue
- Alfonso (1596 – 1669), Marquis of Pomaro.
- Carlo (1597 – 24 April 1637), Abbot Comendador of Lucedio, Governor of Bozzolo from 1631 to 1636.
- Luigi (1599 – 18 December 1660), Imperial General and Governor of Raab; married to Princess Isabella Francesca of Arenberg and had issue
- Camillo (1600 – Spalato, 1658), Patrizio Veneto, General of Artillery in the Venetian army, Commandant of the Mantovan army from 1652, Governor of Monferrato from 1652, Governor General of the Venetian army in Dalmatia.
- Isabella (1601 – ?), a nun.
- Annibale (1602 – 2 August 1668), Governor of Giavarino, President of the War Council of Emperor Ferdinand III, Marshall of the court of Empress Eleonora, Knight of the Order of the Golden Fleece from 1657; married first to Princess Hedwig Maria of Saxe-Lauenburg and then to Countess Barbara Csaky de Koeroeszegh et Adorjan. He had issue from his first marriage.
- (probably illegitimate) Federigo, Colonel of the Imperial Army, Imperial Fieldmarshal in Hungary from 1595, Knight of the Order of the Redeemer from 1614.
