= Ogier of Savoy =

Ogier of Savoy (c.1333–1373) was the second and illegitimate son of Aymon, Count of Savoy, and half-brother of Amadeus VI. He was probably near in age to the latter, for both received new clothes at the same time when children. His first adult responsibility recorded is the castellany of Faverges in 1353. In 1355 he received the castellany of Conflans, which controlled the valleys of the Arly and Isère, which valleys he continued to command for the rest of his career.

Once thought to have died in 1372, it is disproved by a castellany record for 1374, which records "the expenses ... at the festival of Epiphany" for the death of "the Lord Ogier, bastard of Savoy" (expensis ... in festo epiphanie ubi fuit de mandato domini quia dominus ipsum misit apud castellanum Bonitiarum pro morte dominus Ogerii bastardi de Sabaudie). Ogier may have been married to one "N. de Meyria", but his only certain wife was Bernarde de Cevins, heiress of a large patrimony in the Tarentaise, and a widow of Emeric de Montfalcon, who died after 1364. By 1376 Bernarde had remarried a second time to Antelme de Miolans. She had no children by Ogier.
