= Violante Visconti =

Duchess of Clarence (1354–1386)

- Duchess of Clarence; Marchioness of Montferrat
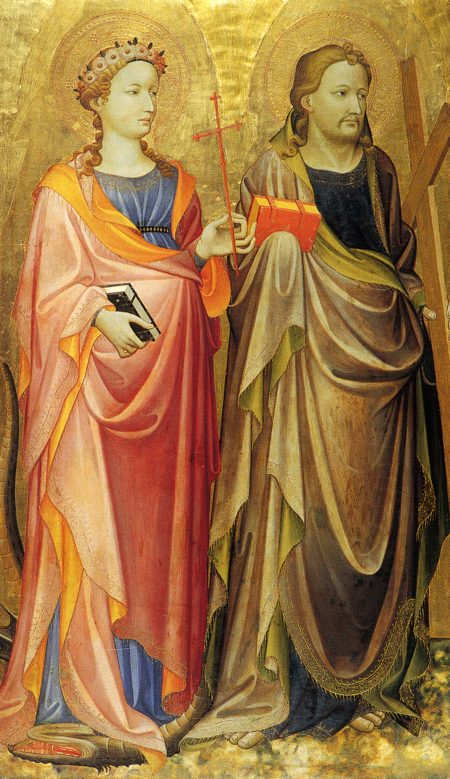
- Violante Visconti with her brother, Gian Galeazzo
- Born: 1354
- Died: November 1386 (aged 31–32); Pavia
- Spouse: Lionel of Antwerp, Duke of Clarence (m. 1368; died 1368) Secondotto, Marquess of Montferrat (m. 1377; died 1378) Ludovico Visconti (m. 1381)
- Issue: Giovanni Visconti
Names
- Violante (Jolantha) Visconti
- House: Visconti
- Father: Galeazzo II Visconti
- Mother: Bianca of Savoy

Violante (Jolantha) Visconti (1354 – November 1386) was the second of two children of Galeazzo II Visconti, Lord of Milan and Pavia, and Bianca of Savoy. Her father gave to her the provinces of Alba, Mondovì, Cuneo, Cherasco, and Demonte as an inheritance.

As a 13-year-old, with the promise of a large dowry from her father, in addition to her territories, she was married to the second son of King Edward III of England, Lionel of Antwerp, Duke of Clarence, in the church of Santa Maria Maggiore, the predecessor of the Cathedral of Santa Maria Nascente, Milan, on 28 May 1368. The wedding festivities were lavish and ostentatious. The banquet, held outside, included 30 courses of meat and fish presented fully gilded. Between the courses, the guests were given gifts such as suits of armour, bolts of cloth, war horses, arms, and hunting dogs. Among the guests were Geoffrey Chaucer, Petrarch, Jean Froissart and John Hawkwood. The marriage was short-lived. Lionel died in Alba on 17 October that year, just five months after the wedding. His death may have been due to food poisoning. The Duchess of Clarence had no issue by the Duke.

On 2 August 1377, Violante's father negotiated a second marriage, to Secondotto, Marquess of Montferrat. Sixteen months later, on 16 December 1378, Secondotto was assassinated after a battle at Piacenza (or Asti). They had no issue.

On 18 April 1381, she married a third time to her cousin Ludovico Visconti, lord governor of Lodi and Parma. He was the son of her paternal uncle Bernabò Visconti and his wife, Beatrice Regina della Scala. They had a son, Giovanni Visconti, who was born after 1382. Barbara Tuchman suggests that her brother may have killed her third husband.

Violante died in Pavia in November 1386, at the age of 32 and was buried in the basilica of San Pietro in Ciel d'Oro.

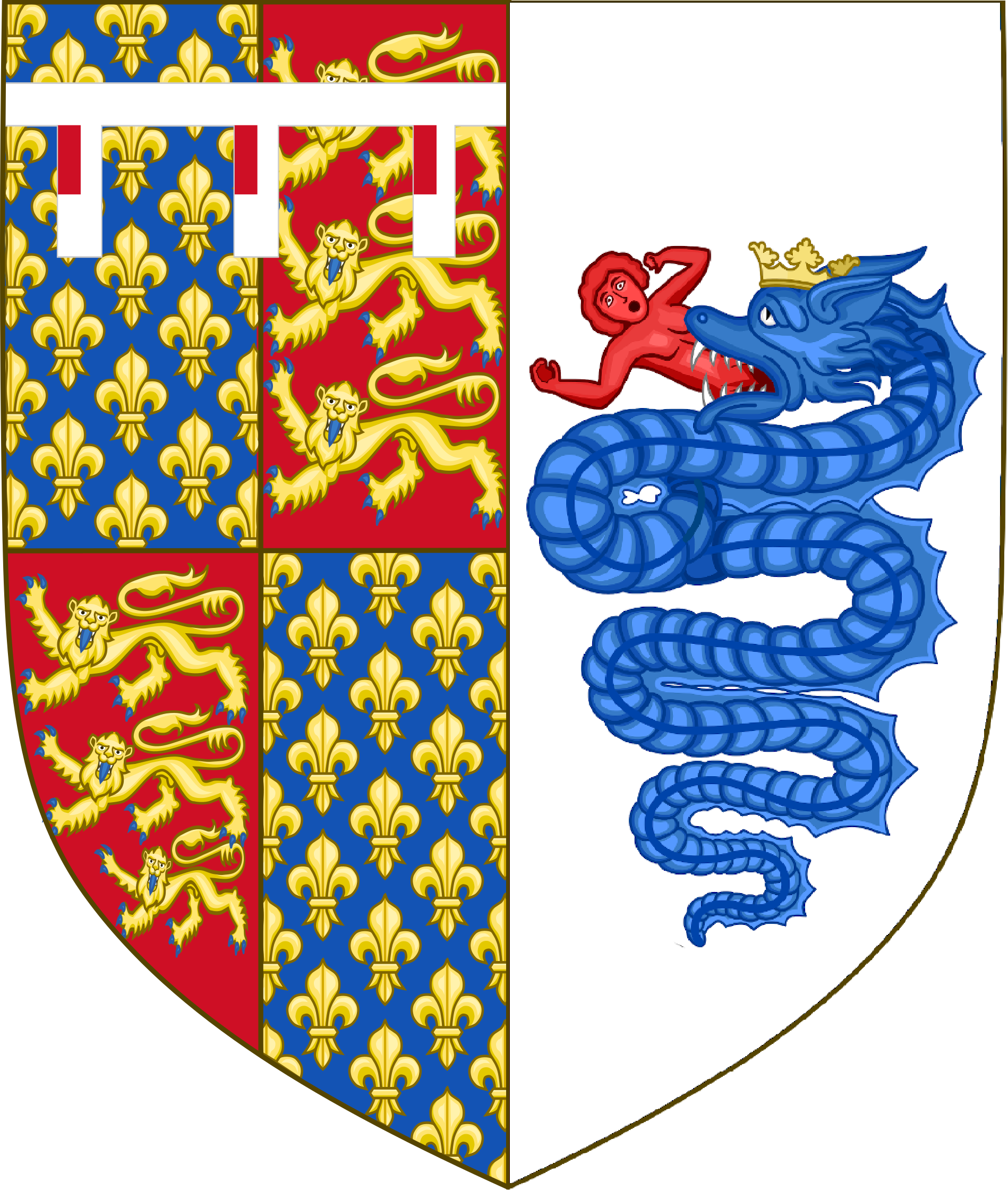
Reputed version of Violante's coat of arms as Duchess consort of Clarence, 1368

== Sources ==
- Cook, Albert Stanburrough (1916). The last months of Chaucer's early patron. Transactions of the Connecticut Academy of Artes and Sciences. Vol. 21. New Haven, Connecticut.
