= Humbert, bastard of Savoy =

Humbert of Savoy (c.1318–1374) was the eldest, but illegitimate son of Aymon, Count of Savoy, and half-brother of Amadeus VI. He first appears in documents in 1338 as sire of Ecluse and castellan of Tarentaise. He accompanied his father to Paris in 1339 and took part in the campaign against the English near Buironfosse, part of the Hundred Years' War.

In 1341 Humber married Audise Andrée (Andrea), heiress of Arvillars, near Montmélian, and established a local dynasty there: his eldest son, Humbert II, inherited Arvillars, and his second, Amadeus, held the lordship of Mollettes. Humbert's second wife was Marguerite de Chevron-Villette. Under Amadeus VI he was castellan of Chillon, then Maurienne, Châtelard-en-Bauges and again of Tarentaise. In 1357 he was made bailli of the County of Savoy and castellan of Montmélian, and held both until his death.

== Issue ==
with Audise d'Arvillard

- Humbert II
- Catherine, married Guillaume II de Luyrieux.
- Antoine

with Marguerite de Chevron-Villette

- Amadeus
