= Theodore II of Montferrat =

Italian noble

Theodore II, Marquis of Montferrat
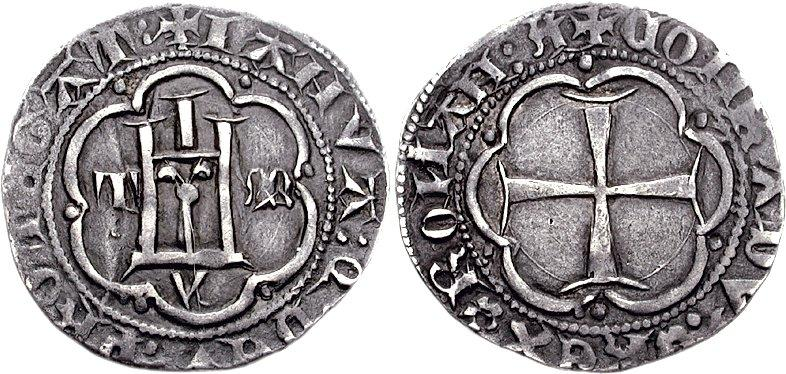
- Moneta of Theodore II 1409–13.

Marquis of Montferrat
- Reign: 1381–1418
- Predecessor: John III Palaiologos
- Successor: John Jacob Palaiologos
- Born: 1364
- Died: 16 April 1418 (aged 54)
- Noble family: Palaeologus-Montferrat
- Spouses: Argentina Malaspina; Joanna of Bar; Margaret of Savoy
- Issue: John Jacob of Montferrat; Sophia, Byzantine Empress
- Father: John II, Marquis of Montferrat
- Mother: Isabella of Majorca

Theodore II Palaeologus (Teodoro II Paleologo) (died 16 April 1418) was the Margrave of Montferrat from 1381.

== Life ==
He was the thirdborn son of John II of Montferrat and Isabel of Majorca. Theodore was named governor of the margraviate after the death of his brother John III. After the death of John II, Montferrat had been plunged into a crisis brought on by the quick succession of two young rulers, neither of whom had the necessary authority to deal with internal state of chaos. During his youth, Theodore was under the regency of Gian Galeazzo Visconti. Soon it became apparent that he was a weak person on his own. By marrying, of his own will, a Milanese woman, the daughter of Leonardo Malaspina, margrave of Lunigiana, he was forced to cede Asti to Gian Galeazzo.

After the death of his first and second wives, he remarried Margaret of Savoy, daughter of Amadeus, Prince of Achaea, on 17 February 1403. Immediately, a war erupted between Theodore and Amadeus VIII of Savoy. Filippo Maria Visconti of Milan intervened on behalf of Theodore in return for the aid the Visconti had received in reestablishing their power in Milan.

In 1400, Theodore had granted Borgo San Martino to one Facino Cane for his service. In 1409, Theodore and Facino succeeded in taking possession of Milan and Genoa. Theodore maintained possession of these places until 1413, when, despite several military expeditions, finding the government of both his Piedmontese and Lombard dominions too difficult, he gave them up in exchange for a large sum.

After the death of Facino, Theodore had to fight the Visconti in Piedmont until an agreement was reached in 1417. Theodore died soon after, leaving a widow in the person of Margaret, later the Blessed Margaret. He was succeeded by his son John Jacob.

== Marriages and children ==
Theodore married, as his first wife, Argentina Malaspina. She was a daughter of Leonardo Malaspina, Marquis of Massa. They had no known children.

In 1393, Theodore married his second wife Joanna of Bar. She was a daughter of Robert I, Duke of Bar and Marie of Valois. Her maternal grandparents were John II of France and Bonne of Bohemia. They had two known children:

- John Jacob of Montferrat (23 March 1395 – 12 March 1445).
- Sophia of Montferrat (died 21 August 1434). Married John VIII Palaiologos.

Joanna died on 15 January 1402. Theodore remained a widower for a year. On 17 January 1403, Theodore married his third wife Margaret of Savoy. She was the eldest daughter of Amedeo, Prince of Achaea and Catherine of Geneva. Their marriage was childless. Margaret survived her husband by forty-six years and died on 23 November 1464.

== Literary References ==
Theodore is one of the major antagonists in Rafael Sabatini's 1926 novel Bellarion the Fortunate, wherein he is portrayed as being sly, untrustworthy, and overly ambitious, though a formidable opponent in war. This is in contrast to his historical repute as a captain, which was not great. Sabatini's book alters history slightly by having Theodore as Regent, when he was in fact the reigning Marquis. Theodore's son and successor John Jacob also appears as a minor character in the book, though he is portrayed as Theodore's nephew.

== Ancestry ==
Ancestors of Theodore II of Montferrat

16. Michael VIII Palaiologos
8. Andronikos II Palaiologos
17. Theodora Doukaina Vatatzina
4. Theodore I, Marquis of Montferrat
18. William VII, Marquis of Montferrat
9. Irene of Montferrat
19. Beatrice of Castile
2. John II, Marquis of Montferrat
20. Sbaralia Spinola
10. Opicino Spinola
5. Argentina Spinola
22. Thomas I, Marquis of Saluzzo
11. Violante of Saluzzo
23. Luigia di Ceva
1. Theodore II, Marquis of Montferrat
24. James II of Majorca
12. Ferdinand of Majorca
25. Esclaramunda of Foix
6. James III of Majorca
26. Isnard de Sabran
13. Isabelle de Sabran
27. Margaret of Villehardouin
3. Isabella of Majorca
28. James II of Aragon
14. Alfonso IV of Aragon
29. Blanche of Anjou
7. Constance of Aragon
30. Gombald d'Entença
15. Teresa d'Entença
31. Constance of Attillon

== Sources ==
- Origone, Sandra (1996). "Marriage Connections between Byzantium and the West in the Age of the Palaiologoi". In Arbel, Benjamin (ed.). Intercultural Contacts in the Medieval Mediterranean. Frank Cass. pp. 226–241.236

Preceded by John III	Margrave of Montferrat; 1381–1418	Succeeded by John Jacob
