= Caterina de' Medici, Governor of Siena =

Governor of Siena from 1627 to 1629

Caterina de' Medici
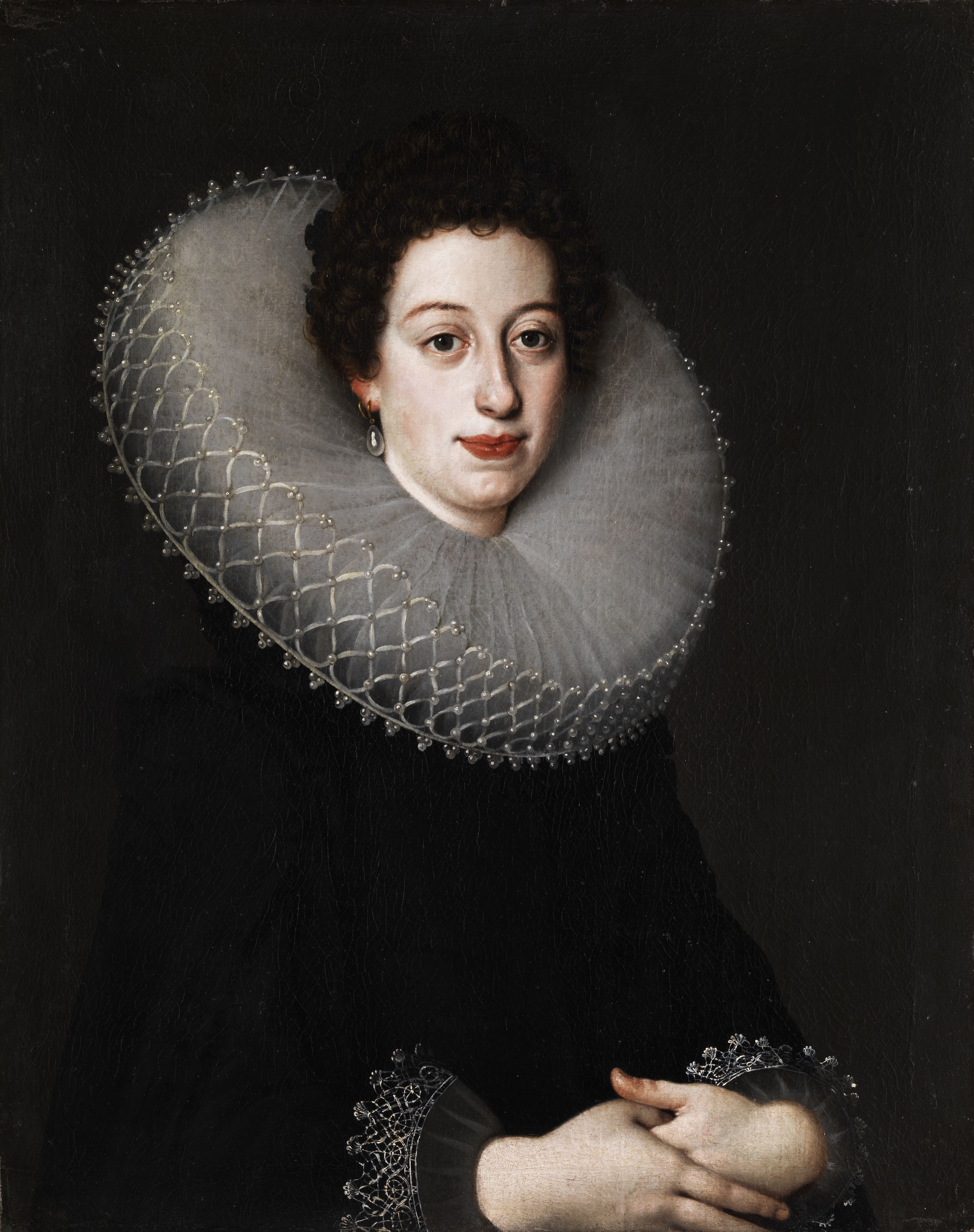
- Portrait after Justus Sustermans, 17th century

Duchess consort of Mantua and Montferrat
- Tenure: 16 February 1617 – October 29, 1626

Governor of Siena
- Tenure: 1627 – 17 April 1629
- Born: 2 May 1593; Palazzo Pitti, Florence, Tuscany
- Died: 17 April 1629 (aged 35); Siena, Tuscany
- Burial: Basilica of San Lorenzo, Florence 43.774991°N 11.253659°E
- Spouse: Ferdinand, Duke of Mantua and Montferrat
- House: House of Medici
- Father: Ferdinando I, Grand Duke of Tuscany
- Mother: Christina of Lorraine

Caterina de' Medici (2 May 1593 – 1629) was a Tuscan noblewoman of the Medici family. She became Duchess of Mantua and Montferrat as the second wife of Duke Ferdinando and Governor of Siena from 1627. She was the second daughter of Grand Duke Ferdinando I of Tuscany and his wife Christina of Lorraine.

== Biography ==
The second daughter and third child of Grand Duke Ferdinando I and Christina of Lorraine, Caterina (Note: named after Catherine de' Medici (who was also her great-grandmother)) was born in Florence, on 2 May 1593.

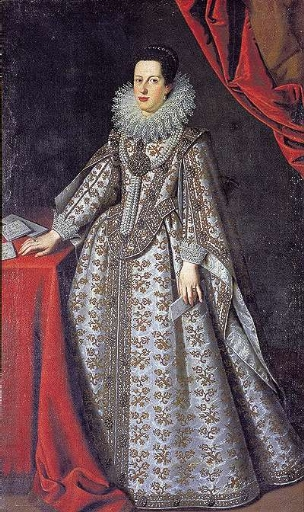
1621 portrait by Sustermans

Caterina was considered as a potential spouse to Henry Frederick, Prince of Wales, heir to the three Kingdoms of England, Scotland and Ireland, but his Anglican religion presented an insurmountable barrier.

Caterina married in 1617 Ferdinando Gonzaga, Duke of Mantua and Montferrat; the marriage, however, was childless.

Upon being made a widow in 1626, she returned to Tuscany. Her nephew, Grand Duke Ferdinando II, created her Governess of Siena in 1627, where she died of smallpox two years later.

In later life, Caterina garnered a reputation for intense piety. G.F. Young asserts that she bore a striking resemblance to her brother Cosimo II and sister Claudia. She was interred in the Medicean necropolis, the Basilica of San Lorenzo.

== Ancestors ==
Ancestors of Caterina de' Medici, Governor of Siena

8. Ludovico di Giovanni de' Medici
4. Cosimo I de' Medici, Grand Duke of Tuscany
9. Maria Salviati
2. Ferdinando I de' Medici, Grand Duke of Tuscany
10. Pedro de Toledo y Zúñiga
5. Eleanor of Toledo
11. María Osorio y Pimentel
1. Caterina de' Medici
12. Francis I, Duke of Lorraine
6. Charles III, Duke of Lorraine
13. Christina of Denmark
3. Christina of Lorraine
14. Henry II of France
7. Claude of Valois
15. Catherine de' Medici

== Notes ==
Caterina de' Medici, Governor of Siena House of Medici Born: 2 May 1593 Died: 17 April 1629
Italian royalty
Preceded by Margaret of Savoy	Duchess of Mantua; 1617–1626	Succeeded by Isabella Gonzaga
Preceded by Margaret of Savoy	Duchess of Montferrat; 1617–1626	Succeeded by Isabella Gonzaga
Political offices
Preceded by Fabrizio Colloredo	Governor of Siena; 1627–1629	Succeeded by Mattias de' Medici
