= Galeazzo II Visconti =

Ruler of Milan (1320–1378)

- Lord of Milan
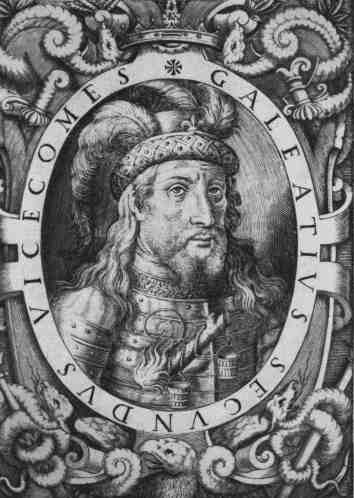
- Galeazzo II

- Coat of arms
- Reign: 1349–1378
- Predecessor: Giovanni
- Successor: Bernabò
- Born: c. 1320
- Died: 4 August 1378
- Noble family: Visconti
- Spouse: Bianca of Savoy
- Issue: Gian Galeazzo, Duke of Milan; Violante, Duchess of Clarence
- Father: Stefano Visconti
- Mother: Valentina Doria

Galeazzo II Visconti (c. 1320 – 4 August 1378) was a member of the Visconti dynasty and a ruler of Milan, Italy. His most notable military campaigns were against Pope Gregory XI, around 1367. These battles fought between the papacy and the Visconti family ultimately ended in a peace treaty. Politically active, he expanded the power of his family, where the Visconti first became hereditary rulers of Milan starting in 1349. He is remembered in conjunction with his patronage of intellectuals and writers, from his sponsorship of Petrarch to the founding of the University of Pavia in 1361.

== Visconti family ==
The founder of the Visconti house is a contested claim, though widespread credit goes to Galeazzo's ancestor, Ottone Visconti. Other notable figures in the Visconti family include Matteo I (1294–1302), Luchino I (1339–1349) and Bernabò (1354–1385). Prior to his rule over Milan, Galeazzo II was briefly exiled by his uncle, Luchino. During his exile, he stayed in Savoy before eventually being invited to return to Milan and share rule over the city with his relatives, Bernabò and Matteo II Visconti. Galeazzo's fame is outstripped by that of his son Gian Galeazzo; under Gian Galeazzo, the Visconti's status was elevated from mere rulers to dukes of Milan.

Galeazzo II became co-ruler of Milan with his brothers Bernabò and Matteo II through a statute forged by the Milanese General Council. During his time as signore, Galeazzo II was focused on increasing the prestige and influence of the Visconti. He forged ties with Holy Roman emperor Charles IV, who granted him and his two brothers the shared title of imperial vicar. Although Visconti military activities in North Italy allowed Galeazzo II to set up his base of operations in Pavia, it also drew him into conflict with the Papacy. His death on August 4, 1378, allowed his son Gian Galeazzo Visconti to expand the influence of the family as signore.

Galeazzo II Visconti's most notable military campaigns were against Pope Gregory XI, beginning roughly around 1367. A series of battles were fought between the papacy and members of the Visconti family, including Bernarbò and Galeazzo Visconti, that ultimately ended in a peace treaty. However, this agreement would be revoked when Bernarbò's alliance with Florence, which had also held a longstanding struggle against the papacy, pulled the Visconti family back into battle during the War of Eight Saints in 1375. Another accomplishment of Galeazzo's was to claim Pavia in 1359, which helped him fund military expeditions. Pavia later became a principal residence of the Visconti family.

Despite his accomplishments, Galeazzo II Visconti's legacy has largely been coloured by a select few aspects of his life. He is largely remembered through the successes of his son, Gian Galeazzo Visconti, who was able to wrest sole control of Milan from his uncle Bernabò Visconti after Galeazzo's death. Yet, there is obvious continuity between the power gained by Galeazzo II and the power maintained, and even expanded upon by Gian Galeazzo, which can be attributed in part to the situation Galeazzo II left his son in.

On top of his political legacy, Galeazzo II is often remembered in conjunction with his patronage of intellectuals and writers, from his sponsorship of Petrarch to the founding of the University of Pavia. Finally, Galeazzo II is associated with a sinister legacy of brutal torture. This comes from his and his brother's introduction of the Querasima torture protocol at the beginning of their dual reign in Milan.

== Family history and events ==
Galeazzo II Visconti was the son of Stefano Visconti and Valentina Doria. The House of Visconti held family ties to Pisa, Sardinia and Milan. Originally, the founding of the Milanese Visconti line was a particularly contested issue. Galeazzo's ancestors, Azzone and Ottone Visconti, both held legitimate claims to be considered the founder of their house. However, it was under Ottone that the power of the Visconti house expanded before becoming the dynastic power they were later infamous for. Previously, the Visconti family had only enjoyed limited privileges within the city. As a result of his efforts, Ottone was recognized as the official founder of the Visconti house over Azzone.

As the archbishop of Milan from 1277 to 1294, Ottone wrested control over Milan from its previous rulers before skillfully manoeuvring his nephew Matteo I Visconti into a position of power. Matteo il Magno (roughly translated to mean 'the Great') ruled from 1294 to 1302 and then again from 1311 to 1322, preceding Galeazzo's rule. Matteo notably achieved control over Pavia, Vercelli, Novara and Como. Though he was temporarily ousted from power by a rebellion, Matteo later received the position of imperial vicar general during his second period of rule. Holy Roman Emperor Louis IV then eventually appointed Matteo as Lord of Milan, thirty years after he first obtained a position in the secular government. In this way, Matteo aided in establishing an enduring lordship over Milan; this moment in time significantly contributed to the hereditary quality of Visconti power. Yet regardless of his achievements, Matteo later died a condemned heretic.

Galeazzo I succeeded Matteo I from 1322 to 1327 and preceded Galeazzo II's rule in 1354 by 27 years. Before Galeazzo II became the ruler of Milan, he was preceded by: Azzone (1329–1339), Luchino I (1339–1349), and Giovanni (1339–1354). Prior to his rule, Galeazzo was a fairly self-possessed individual. He had proven himself to be a capable diplomat and a lover of the arts. In particular, he was one of Petrarch's many patrons. Galeazzo also expressed a love for travelling: in 1343, he embarked on a pilgrimage to Jerusalem. He briefly resided in Savoy for several years, where his uncle Luchino had exiled him in 1345. Following his exile and Luchino's death, Galeazzo returned to Milan in 1349 at the behest of his remaining uncle, Giovanni Visconti. His uncle also made him governor of Bologna. The following year, Galeazzo commissioned the Visconti Castle, otherwise known as Castello Visconteo, located in Pavia. The castle became the main Pavian residence of the Visconti family. During the same year, another significant event occurred in his life on September 28. Perhaps partially reflective of his fondness for Savoy as formed during his years in exile, Galeazzo went on to marry Bianca of Savoy. She was the daughter of Count Aymon and the sister of Amadeus VI of Savoy. The marriage between the two consequently further cemented the alliance between Savoy and Milan. Together, the couple had two known children.

Almost immediately after getting married, the two had their first and most well-known child, a son by the name of Gian Galeazzo in 1351, who was married off to Isabelle, the daughter of King John II of France. Their only other known child was a daughter named Violante. She was born in 1354, the same year Galeazzo assumed shared rule over Milan with his two brothers, Matteo II and Bernabò. He married his daughter off to Lionel of Antwerp, son of Edward III of England, and gave a dowry of 200,000 gold florins.

Matteo was assassinated early on in their rule in 1355. Upon Matteo's death, Galeazzo obtained the western part of Lombardy, while Bernabò received the eastern one. In 1362, Galeazzo's own health worsened, and he moved his court to Pavia, which he had reconquered two years earlier, and where he died in 1378. Though Galeazzo died of natural causes, the same cannot be said for his last remaining brother. Bernabò received a fate similar to Matteo's and was assassinated in 1385. Galeazzo's son, Gian Galeazzo, succeeded his father and uncle's rule and went on to achieve fame greater than that of his sibling and father. Beginning his twenty-five-year rule in 1378, Gian Galeazzo eventually became the first official duke of Milan in 1395.

== Political affairs ==
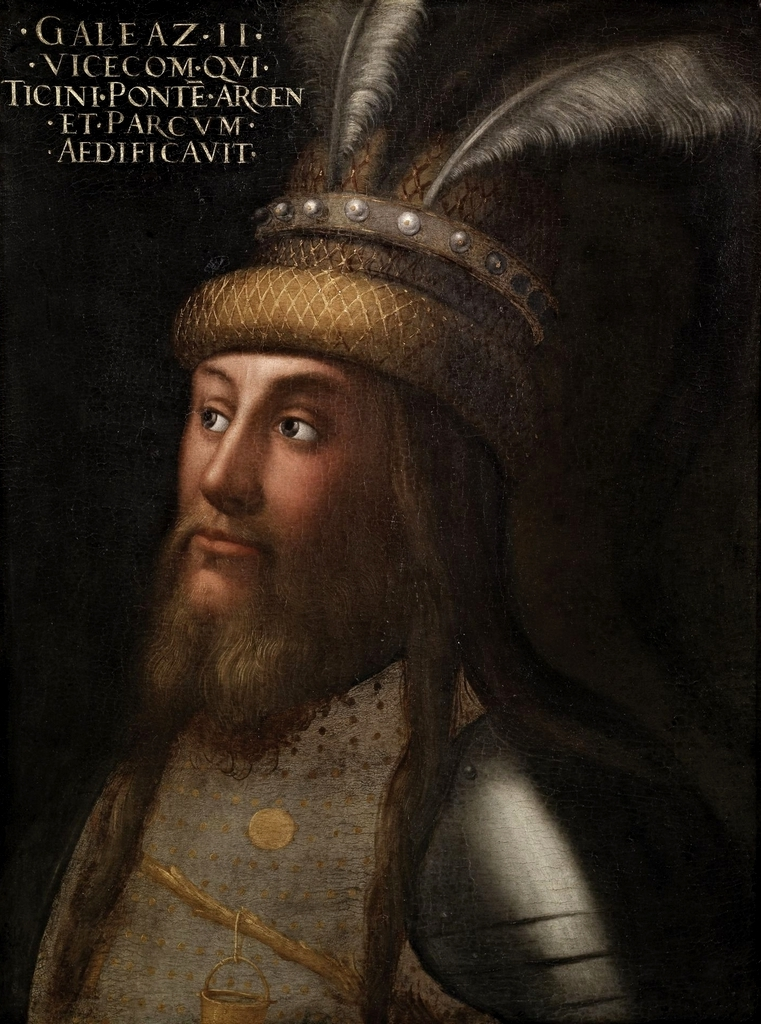
Galeazzo II Visconti who built the Ticin Bridge and Vernavola Park painting by Cristofano dell'Altissimo

In his political life, Galeazzo II Visconti worked to expand the power of his family. The Visconti first became the hereditary rulers of Milan on May 31, 1349, when the General Council of Milan created a statute that the office of dominus generalis would be inherited by the legitimate male descendants of Matteo Visconti, who was the grandfather of Galeazzo II Visconti. One of Matteo Visconti's sons, Luchino Visconti, wanted his son Luchino Novello to succeed him as signore of Milan, but this proposal was rejected by Galeazzo II, Matteo II and Bernabò Visconti, who were the sons of Stefano Visconti. After the death of Giovanni Visconti, who was the brother of Galeazzo, Luchino and Stefano Visconti, the General Council of Milan created another statute which proclaimed that Galeazzo II, Matteo II and Bernabò Visconti were to govern Milan as co-rulers because they were the only male adult descendants of their grandfather Matteo Visconti. Other territories under Visconti jurisdiction were to be divided among them as well. Matteo II Visconti died five months after he and his two brothers obtained the title of imperial vicar from the Holy Roman Emperor, and although the exact cause of his death was unknown, he left his brothers Galeazzo II and Bernabò as the two remaining co-rulers of Milan.

During the reign of the three brothers, they wanted to increase their privileges and governing powers, so they decided to re-establish good relations with the Holy Roman Empire so they could acquire the status of imperial vicars. On 8 May 1355, a diploma of a new vicariate for the three brothers was forged after Emperor Charles IV accepted a payment of 150000 florins from them. According to Jane Black, the imperial vicariate granted more privileges to the three brothers compared to the privileges that their predecessors had received. Most of the privileges the three brothers received from the vicariate were related to judicial processes such as the right to raise imperial taxes. The diploma also granted the Visconti brothers full control over communal laws and customs in their territory. The title of imperial vicar was also hereditary, meaning that the future lords of Milan would be granted the same rights that were granted to the Visconti brothers by Charles IV. Although Galeazzo II and Bernabò continued to refer to themselves as dominus generalis in their official documents, the two brothers eventually referred to themselves as imperial vicars as well to demonstrate their abundance of power to their subjects.

Prior to Galeazzo II Visconti's ascension to power, Milan was ruled by Giovanni Visconti, who brought Galeazzo II and Bernabò back from exile. Giovanni's military activities drew the ire of the Papacy during the late 1340s, which led to the Papacy writing a letter of complaint to Galeazzo II for the Visconti family's incursions in Faenza. Galeazzo II encountered more conflicts with the Papacy during his rule as signore due to his own policy of expanding Visconti influence with his brother Bernabò in Northern Italy. When the Visconti tried to re-establish their influence in Bologna, a conflict between the Visconti family and the Papacy occurred and this led to the excommunication of Bernabò for heresy. Furthermore, persuaded by the Papacy, Charles IV revoked the vicariate that he granted to the Visconti family in 1361, although he returned the title to them four years later on the condition that they remained loyal and obedient to the Holy Roman Empire and its emperor. Another war broke out in 1372 when Galeazzo II tried to retake the city of Asti, which was opposed by the Count of Savoy. Visconti military activity in the 1370s led to another conflict with the Papacy when Pope Gregory XI condemned both Bernabò and Galeazzo II Visconti as heretics, as well as revoking their title as imperial vicar by the Holy Roman Emperor once more in 1372.

In the year 1359, the Galeazzo II Visconti conquered the city of Pavia, which became his base of operations. Those who were exiled from Pavia prior to the Visconti conquest were allowed to return, and they were granted political amnesty. Although the two brothers had agreed on sharing authority in Milan, Galeazzo's absence from the city allowed his brother Bernabò to possess complete authority over the city. In 1361, Galeazzo II was also able to officially establish a university in Pavia due to a charter that was granted to him by Emperor Charles. Galeazzo II had also married off his son Gian Galeazzo to Isabella of Valois, who was the daughter of the King of France. Galeazzo II also helped his own son acquire political power through a marriage with the French princess Isabella of Valois, which granted his son the title Count of Vertus. On August 4, 1379, Galeazzo II Visconti died, leaving Bernabò as the last of the three co-ruling brothers of Milan. Bernabò would live until 1385, when he was thrown in jail due to a conspiracy hatched by Galeazzo II Visconti's son, Gian Galeazzo Visconti. Gian Galeazzo succeeded his father and became the signore of all the lands that were controlled by his father.

== Military campaigns and territorial claims ==
After his death in 1367, Cardinal Albonoz left Italy particularly susceptible to control by mercenaries. This would give rise to merchant families within Italian city-states, like the Visconti family, who came to dominate Milan and the rest of northern Italy by the fifteenth century. Galeazzo II Visconti, alone, played an important role in centralizing power under the Visconti name through various military campaigns in the fourteenth century. These military operations allowed him to come into control of densely populated areas and to, therefore, amass a significant amount of power that would be passed down to his son Gian Galeazzo Visconti. Gian Galeazzo's inheritance helped him come closest to uniting all of Italy under a central rule, therefore marking the important contribution that Galeazzo II made to the Visconti family legacy.

During the fourteenth century, the pope and emperor had little influence over Italian political affairs. Nobility did not ensure power. Therefore, Italian city-states were left to choose their leader, whose responsibility was to defend their city from external enemies and to wage war on rival cities in hopes of gaining more territory. Members of powerful merchant families, such as Galeazzo II, would often be selected for these positions and would seize neighbouring cities in order to extend their rule; affluence and their family name would gain them recognition and help them to become elected as city-state leaders. They would then be awarded designations such as 'vicarite for life' in order to legitimize their authority over civilians. Galeazzo II was granted this title as was his brother, Bernabò Visconti, once they gained territory in northern Italy.

The Visconti family's seizing of territory, in particular, was seen as a major threat to the Papacy. Members of the merchant family often took spiritual authority into their own hands and regulated temporal affairs throughout their land. As this served to further centralize the Visconti power and drew authority away from the papacy, battles between the two factions occurred frequently. Both groups would form alliances with local and international powers in order to suppress their rival's army and to prevent their opponent's accumulation of power. Galeazzo II was drawn into warfare with Pope Gregory XI when serving in an alliance with his brother, Bernabò V; the papacy became his biggest military opponent during his reign of northern Italian city-states. The rivalry between Bernabò and Pope Gregory XI had been carried down from Pope Urban V, who sought to expel the brothers and to revoke their territorial possessions. Galeazzo stood to lose Angevin cities in Piedmont after Pope Gregory attempted to suppress his army by forming alliances with local and international powers such as Genoa, Amadeus of Savoy, the Marquis of Monferrato, Niccolo D’Este, Albert, Duke of Austria, Gerald, the elector of Nuremberg and Charles, the Holy Roman Emperor. By doing so, Gregory XI looked to gain territory regionally and to deprive the Visconti brothers of international mercenary support. The battle between the papacy and the Visconti brothers continued until Gregory signed a peace treaty with the brothers in the spring of 1378.

Galeazzo's distinction and authority over different city-states was crucial in helping fund military campaigns against the papacy and in helping to perpetuate his rule over northern Italy. The financing of military expeditions was dependent on the taxation of Galeazzo's city-states, some of which included Milan and Pavia, which he claimed in 1359 and made the primary residence of the Visconti family. However, multiple wars, heavy taxation and refusal to align with the papacy generated disapproval amongst Galeazzo's subjects. Inconsistent and costly governance caused resistance against Galeazzo II's rule.

It has been argued that Galeazzo II's reign was tyrannical. The use of violent tactics, assistance from exiled opponents, expansionist ideals which challenged the papacy at the expense of subjects, and seizing power over regions without permission of the rightful overlord, empire or papacy were traits found within Galeazzo's rule. An example of his alleged tyranny was when Galeazzo II wrongfully seized the city-state of Pavia on 13 November 1359. In order to weaken the Visconti influence, Emperor Charles IV gave the vicariate of Pavia to Giovanni Palaeologus II. After a rebellion led by the Augustinian friar Jacopo Bussolari broke out, calling for the city's independence, Galeazzo recognized Pavia's vulnerability and seized the city-state for himself. Though the citizens resisted his domination, they eventually gave in to Galeazzo's control. Throughout his rule, Galeazzo was also accused of heresy, seeking to kill the pope, and fighting to claim lordship of all of Italy, which supports the allegations of tyrannical rule.

Galeazzo's brother Bernabò Visconti, whom he fought alongside when challenging the papacy, has also been considered a tyrant. Bernabò was particularly brutal towards the church and was listed as an enemy as a result. Together, the brothers fought against Pope Urban V and Pope Gregory XI and were both excommunicated by the papacy in 1373. Military figures such as John Hawkwood and Amadeus of Savoy were hired to attack the Visconti brothers and their city-states, Pavia and Piacenza. However, Amadeus helped to end the long-standing battle between the papacy and the Visconti brothers after recognizing the increasingly oppressive nature of the papacy, which hoped to destroy the Milanese family at all costs, and which did not recognize their legitimate territorial dominions. Galeazzo II's marriage to Bianca of Savoy re-formed an alliance with the House of Savoy, and Gregory XI was compelled to sign a peace treaty with Galeazzo II and Bernabò in the spring of 1375. Peace between Pope Gregory XI and the Visconti family was transient in that soon after their agreement, Bernabò's alliance with Florence, which had a longstanding struggle with the papacy, called for their support in the War of Eight Saints, waged against Gregory XI. Galeazzo II fought against the papacy alongside his brother until his death in 1378.

== Legacy ==
Along with his many accomplishments in life, Galeazzo II Visconti left behind a legacy after his death in 1378. He was best known for having left behind: continued Visconti rule under Gian Galeazzo Visconti, his son; and his patronage of intellectuals and their associated institutions.

The first, and most commendable legacy of Galeazzo II is his commitment to both the sponsorship and patronage of scholars and intellectual institutions. Galeazzo II Visconti is known to have established the University of Pavia in 1361, upon moving his court to that city in the face of growing rivalry with his brother, Bernabò Visconti. Galeazzo II's founding of this university came with the help of Emperor Charles IV of the Holy Roman Empire, with the granting of the university's charter. The University of Pavia, carefully fostered by Galeazzo II, and in turn, by his son, Gian Galeazzo, would develop into a leader amongst the Northern Italian scholarly institutions, and would directly precipitate the widespread circulation of legal and medical texts throughout Pavia. Figures such as Lorenzo Valla would later be associated with the university. One step beyond establishing the University of Pavia, Galeazzo II Visconti personally entertained scholarly figures at his court and offered patronage to them while they remained there. Literary greats like Geoffrey Chaucer ventured from England to Milan whilst it was under the control of the Visconti to study the vast libraries of the Visconti family, which contained works by figures like: Virgil, Seneca, Ovid, Macrobius, Dante, and Petrarch. There is also evidence of Petrarch being a guest of Galeazzo II's court, where he wrote for a number of years before his time in Padua. This is known through the extensive volumes of writing personally belonging to Petrarch which were brought from Padua to the Visconti Libraries for his stint under the Visconti.

Galeazzo II's rule would serve to set up Gian Galeazzo's rule of Pavia. It is immediately evident just how influential the father had been on his son. It is thought that Galeazzo II and his brother, Bernabò Visconti, came to rule after a successful plot against their third brother, Matteo II. Very much in the same vein, Gian Galeazzo was able to mastermind a coup d'état against Bernabò, his uncle. This bloody legacy of homicide, at first taking the form of fratricide, and then avunculicide, is a large part of the Visconti legacy forged by Galeazzo II. Yet another legacy of Galeazzo II Visconti with his son is the importance placed on education. Gian Galeazzo, upon ascending to the throne at Pavia, remained content to study, retreating from the mess of Italian politics in Northern Italy, and focusing on his Humanist studies at the University of Pavia; the same university which his father had set up when he moved his seat of power there. The final Visconti legacy passed from father to son is that of embarking upon massive building projects. For Galeazzo II, this was the massive palace he constructed at Pavia, which was completed for him in 1363. For his son Gian Galeazzo, this tendency to build as a means of impressing the populace continued. Gian Galeazzo Visconti commissioned the construction of the Certosa of Pavia and provided help and counsel in the construction of the Duomo in Milan when he became Signore of all Milan, following the overthrow of Bernabò Visconti.

Galeazzo II instituted the Quaresima. Rather than one method of torture, this lasted for forty days with the intention of resulting in the death of the individual, who, by undergoing this regimen, had already been branded a traitor by the state and marked for execution. The Quaresima protocol involves several torture mechanisms employed on the victim for an entire day. This is followed by a reprieve of one day's time, to allow the victim to recuperate enough to endure yet another day of suffering. The prescribed tortures included: the Rack, the Wheel, Flaying, Eye-gouging, the cutting off of facial features and limbs, as well as the Strappado; a form of torture where the subject's hands were bound behind his back, and then hoisted off the ground and repeatedly dropped with the intention of dislodging the shoulder joints, resulting in immense pain. Galeazzo II Visconti, along with his brother Bernabò, is credited with the institution of this particularly vicious means of torture. It is thought that this torture protocol was proclaimed in an edict upon the ascent to the rulership of Milan by both Galeazzo II and Bernabò, likely as a means of intimidating the populace in order to cement their newfound rule.

== See also ==
- History of Milan (Middle Ages)
- History of Pavia
- Visconti Castle

== Sources ==
- Bauer, Susan Wise (2013). "The House of Visconti and the Papal States - France and Italy, 1368-1390". The history of the Renaissance World: from the rediscovery of Aristotle to the conquest of Constantinople. New York, NY: Norton. pp. 571–576. ISBN 9780393059762. OCLC 864561433.
- Black, Jane (2009). Absolutism in Renaissance Milan : plenitude of power under the Visconti and the Sforza, 1329-1535. Oxford New York: Oxford University Press. ISBN 9780199565290. OCLC 503830199.
- Bueno de Mesquita, D. M. (Daniel Meredith) (2011) [1941]. Giangaleazzo Visconti, Duke of Milan (1351-1402): A Study in the Political Career of an Italian Despot (reprint ed.). Cambridge, UK: Cambridge University Press. ISBN 9780521234559. OCLC 746456124.
- Cox, Eugene L. (1967). The Green Count of Savoy: Amadeus VI and transalpine Savoy in the fourteenth century. Princeton, NJ, US: Princeton University Press. LCCN 67-11030. OCLC 797592703.
- Dale, Sharon (2007). "Contra damnationis filios: the Visconti in fourteenth-century papal diplomacy". Journal of Medieval History. 33 (1): 1–32. doi:10.1016/j.jmedhist.2007.01.001. ISSN 1304-4184. OCLC 4902654480. S2CID 153655810.
- D'Elia, Anthony (2009). A Sudden Terror: The Plot To Murder the Pope in Renaissance. Cambridge, MA, US: Harvard University Press. ISBN 9780674053724. OCLC 648759749. OCLC 648759749, 896138020.
- Gamberini, Andrea (2015). "Chapter 1 Milan and Lombardy in the Era of the Visconti and the Sforza". Companion to Late Medieval and Early Modern Milan : The Distinctive Features of an Italian State. Brill's companions to European history. Vol. 7. Leiden, the Netherlands: Brill. pp. 19–45. ISBN 9789004284128. OCLC 897378766.
- Hay, Denys (1961). The Italian Renaissance in its Historical Background. Cambridge, UK: Cambridge University Press. ISBN 9780521291040. OCLC 425960418.
- Jamison, Evelyn Mary; Ady, Cecelia Mary; Ewart, K Dorothea; Terry, Charles Sanford; Davis, H W Carless (1917). "ITALY, 1250-1527". Italy, medieval and modern, a history. Cambridge, UK: Clarendon Press. hdl:2027/mdp.39015008989496. OCLC 561023129.
- King, Margaret L. (2003). The Renaissance in Europe. London, UK: Laurence King Publishing. ISBN 9781856693745. OCLC 54503284.
- Ko, Allan (2014). "Virtu and Fortuna: Machiavelli's reflections on Italian Renaissance Politics". The Concord Review. 25 (1). ISSN 0002-161X. OCLC 319602000.
- Law, John (2000). "15 - Italy in the age of Dante and Petrarch; (a) - The Italian North". In Jones, Michael (ed.). The New Cambridge Medieval History. Vol. 6: c.1300–c.1415. Cambridge, UK: Cambridge University Press. pp. 442–468. doi:10.1017/CHOL9780521362900.021. ISBN 9781139055741. OCLC 317596972.
- Marina, Areli (Fall 2013). "The Langoboard Revival of Matte il Magno Visconti, Lord of Milan". I Tatti Studies in the Italian Renaissance. 16 (1/2): 377–414. doi:10.1086/673405. ISSN 2037-6731. JSTOR 10.1086/673405. OCLC 5530286111. S2CID 194035594.
- Pullan, Brian S. (1973). A History of Early Renaissance Italy From the Mid-Thirteenth to the Mid-Fifteenth Century. London, UK: Allen Lane. ISBN 9780713903041. OCLC 630437.
- Tracy, Larissa (2012). Torture and Brutality in Medieval Literature: Negotiations of National Identity. Cambridge, UK: D.S. Brewer. ISBN 9781846158209. JSTOR 10.7722/j.ctt3fgnmw. OCLC 857069733.
- Tuchman, Barbara W. (1978). "The Gilded Shroud". A Distant Mirror: The Calamitous 14th Century. New York, NY: Knopf. ISBN 9781299041806. OCLC 760908516.
- Zaggia, Massimo (2015). "Chapter 7 Culture in Lombardy, ca. 1350–1535". In Gamberini, Andrea (ed.). Companion to Late Medieval and Early Modern Milan : The Distinctive Features of an Italian State. Brill's companions to European history. Vol. 7. Leiden, the Netherlands: Brill. pp. 166–189. ISBN 9789004284128. OCLC 897378766.

Italian nobility
Preceded by Cardinal Giovanni Visconti, Archbishop of Milan	Lord of Milan; 1349–1378	Succeeded by Bernabò Visconti
