= The Concord Review =

Academic journal of high school history papers

- Discipline: History
- Language: English
- Edited by: William H. Fitzhugh

Publication details
- History: 1987–present
- Publisher: The Concord Review, Inc. (United States)
- Frequency: Quarterly

Standard abbreviations
- ISO 4: Concord Rev.

Indexing
- ISSN: 0895-0539
- LCCN: 88660102
- OCLC no.: 16415030

Links
- Journal homepage

The Concord Review: A Quarterly Review of Essays by Students of History is an academic journal dedicated to publishing the history research papers of high school students. It was established in 1987 by William H. Fitzhugh, a Massachusetts educator dismayed with the "dumbing down" of writing standards in American secondary schools.

The Review publishes about 5% of its submissions, and is considered among the most prestigious awards for high school students. Issued quarterly, the journal publishes research monographs on history topics from high school students from any country, as long as they are in English. Submissions are typically 8500 words long, and must be accompanied by a subscription fee (ranging from $70-$150) to the journal in order to be considered.

== Related activities ==
In addition to publishing the journal, The Concord Review, Inc. engages in a number of other projects. Five outstanding essays per year are awarded the Ralph Waldo Emerson Prize of about $3000. Fitzhugh also founded the National History Club, with chapters in hundreds of American high schools. Also, The Concord Review, Inc. operates a service called the National Writing Board, which for a fee of $100 will evaluate student writing and forward the results to college admissions committees.

== Reception and support ==
Having a paper accepted for publication by The Concord Review is viewed very favorably by university admissions committees, with the Dean of Admissions for Harvard College likening it to winning a national mathematics contest. Arthur M. Schlesinger Jr., taped a video testimonial praising the Review for providing a scholarly venue for high school students. Other historians, including David McCullough and Shelby Foote, have also praised the Review.

The Review has been featured in a number of media outlets, including Forbes, The New York Times, and The Washington Post. Among others, the Review has been supported by David Rubenstein, John Thornton, and John Abele.
