= Isabella of Majorca =

Queen of Majorca (1337–1406)

Isabella

Queen of Majorca
- Reign: 1375–1406 (In pretendence)
- Born: 1337
- Died: 1406 (aged 68–69); Montpellier
- Spouse: John II, Marquess of Montferrat; Konrad of Reischach and Jungnau
- Issue: Otto III of Montferrat; John III of Montferrat; Theodore II of Montferrat; William of Montferrat; Margaret, Countess of Urgell; Michael of Reischach and Jungnau
- House: House of Barcelona
- Father: James III of Majorca
- Mother: Constance of Aragon

Isabella of Majorca (Catalan: Elisabet; 1337–1406) was the titular Queen of Majorca and Countess of Roussillon and Cerdanya from 1375 to her death. She was the last titular monarch of Majorca.

== Life ==
=== Early life ===
She was the daughter of James III and his first wife, Constance of Aragon. Her maternal grandparents were Alfonso IV of Aragon and his first wife Teresa d'Entença. Her paternal grandparents were Ferdinand of Majorca and his wife Isabelle de Sabran. After the death of her mother, Isabella's father remarried to Violante of Vilaragut, who gave Isabella a half-sister named Esclaramunda, who died young.

Her father had lost the kingdom (1343) and he died in the Battle of Llucmajor (1349) by Peter IV of Aragon. Isabella was captured with her brother and stepmother by her uncle King Peter after the battle in which her father was killed. Allegedly, the native Catalans were enraged by this and broke into the prison to free both Isabella and her brother. However other sources state she was confined to the convent of the Clarissans at Valencia with her stepmother. She was freed in 1358/59, thanks to the efforts of her stepmother, on the condition that she renounce her rights to Majorca.

=== Titular reign of brother ===
On 4 September 1358, Isabella married John II Palaiologos, Marquess of Montferrat, in Montpellier, with the contract being officially signed 12 October 1358. Her marriage was arranged by her stepmother, who was then living at the Court of Monferrato. The marriage was somewhat controversial, as it caused Emperor Charles IV to turn against the Marquess. Throughout their marriage, John had Isabella as a witness to the execution of several documents.

Isabella had a close relationship with her brother, and accompanied him during his invasion of Roussillon. James was unfortunately captured by Henry II of Castile, but with the help of her sister-in-law, Isabella was able to ransom him in 1370.

=== Titular queen ===
Isabella was a woman of "gigantic stature". She succeeded to the titles and pretensions for the Kingdom of Majorca, as well as the actual lands, from her brother James IV, who supposedly died in her arms, on his death in 1375.

Isabella was unable at any point to mount a serious attempt to regain her claimed territories. In her attempt to reclaim the throne, Isabella tried to adopt Louis I, titular king of Sicily and Jerusalem, as her heir and co-regent in 1375, but seems to have lost claim to Joanna I of Naples. Isabella later sold her rights to Majorca to Louis in exchange for an annual annuity of 12 hundred Pounds, a one time payment of 5 thousand Francs, and a place at the château of Gallargues. Louis's goal was to annex Roussillon to provide a buffer against Aragonese expansion. Louis's successors continued to include Majorca among their titles although they never attempted a conquest of the island kingdom.

In 1375, Isabella remarried (John died in 1372) to Konrad of Reischach and Jungnau in secret. The marriage produced a son Michael; they later separated.

Her children did not want to be kings of Majorca, but her only daughter, Margaret, accepted to reclaim her rights to Aragon of being the mother of the future king of Majorca, for her son, Count James II of Urgell.

Isabella died in France around 1406.

== Children ==
With John she had five children:

- Otto III of Montferrat (1358–1378)
- John III of Montferrat (1360–1381)
- Theodore II of Montferrat (1364–1418)
- William (1365–1400)
- Margaret (c. 1365-1420), married in 1375 to Peter II of Urgell

With Konrad she had a son:

- Michael of Reischach and Jungnau

== Ancestry ==
Ancestors of Isabella of Majorca

8. James II of Majorca
4. Ferdinand of Majorca
9. Esclaramunda of Foix
2. James III of Majorca
10. Isnard of Sabran
5. Isabella of Sabran
11. Margaret of Villehardouin
1. Isabella of Majorca
12. James II of Aragon
6. Alfonso IV of Aragon
13. Blanche of Anjou
3. Constance of Aragon
14. Gombau of Entença
7. Teresa of Entença
15. Constança of Antillón

Titles in pretence
Preceded by James IV	— TITULAR — Queen of Majorca; 1375–1406	Louis I
