= Aymon, Count of Savoy =

Italian noble (1291–1343)

Aymon

Count of Savoy
- Reign: 1329–1343
- Predecessor: Edward
- Successor: Amadeus VI
- Born: 15 December 1291; Chambéry, County of Savoy
- Died: 22 June 1343 (aged 51); Montmélian, County of Savoy
- Burial: Hautecombe Abbey
- Spouse: Yolande of Montferrat
- Issue Detail: Amadeus VI, Count of Savoy; Bianca of Savoy
- House: Savoy
- Father: Amadeus V, Count of Savoy
- Mother: Sybille of Bâgé

Aymon (1291–1343), also known as Aymon the Peaceful (Italian: Aimone il Pacifico, Arpitan: Èmon lo Pacefico), was the count of Savoy from 1329 until his death in 1343.

== Early life ==
Aymon was born in Chambéry. His father was Amadeus V, Count of Savoy, and he was the younger brother of Edward, Count of Savoy.

== Career ==
In 1321, Aymon oversaw the siege engines at the siege of Corbières. On the death of Amadeus V in 1323, Aymon was lord of Bresse under Edward.

Coat of arms of Savoy

As a younger son of a noble family, Aymon had planned on a life in the church. When Edward died in 1329, Aymon was in Avignon at the court of Pope John XXII.

In 1329, shortly after becoming count, Aymon established a committee to settle the territorial disputes with his cousin, Amadeus III of Geneva. These disputes had been an ongoing feud between the families for generations, but they were able to resolve them through years of negotiations without resorting back to war. This was how Aymon earned his nickname of 'The Peaceful'.

He contested the title Count of Savoy with his niece, Joan of Savoy since Savoy operated under Salic law and had never had a female ruler. Joan with the support of her husband, John III, Duke of Brittany defended Joan's claim. John and Joan had no issue. Eventually, a settlement was reached whereby Aymon obtained the Countship in return for providing a monetary payment to Joan.

He spent much of his first few years as count at war with the Dauphin, Guigues VIII of Viennois, continuing a feud which went back for generations in their families. After Guigues was killed besieging La Perrière in 1333, Philip VI of France was able to broker a truce between Aymon and the new Dauphin, Humbert II of Viennois, brother of Guigues.

In August 1334, in the buildup to the Hundred Years' War, Edward III of England sent an embassy to Aymon to convince him to join the impending conflict on the side of the English. Aymon declined to commit, as he held lands both in England and in Normandy, so was technically a subject of both kings. In April 1337, Philip sent similar messages on the other side. Aymon replied that he could not go abroad to fight as he still had territorial disputes with the Dauphiné. Philip quickly settled a more lasting peace, as Humbert was trying to sell the Dauphiné. Aymon then led his forces as part of the French war effort from 1339 to 1342. He often fought alongside Amadeus III of Geneva.

In 1330, Aymon established a chancellor's office to manage official documents. He financed the expansion of a burial chapel at the Hautecombe Abbey which was constructed from 1331 to 1342. In 1340, he set up judges to specifically handle appeals at a level between the castellans and himself, to ease his workload in such cases.

== Marriage and children ==
Prior to his marriage, Aymon also fathered several illegitimate children, who were raised in his household, even after his marriage. These included:

- Humbert, who worked for his father, and later his brother the count.
- Ogier, who worked for his father
- Amadeus (d. May 1346)
- Benoît
- Jean la Mitre (d. Aug 1348), lord of Cuine and castellan of Tarentaise and Entremont
- Jean, canon at Lausanne
- Marie
- Donata, a nun
- Huguette, a nun

In 1330, Aymon married Yolande Palaeologina of Montferrato granddaughter of Byzantine Emperor Andronikos II Palaiologos and had 5 children, only 2 lived to adulthood:

1. Amadeus VI (Amadeo VI) (1334–1383) the Green Count
2. Bianca (1336–1388), married in 1350 to Galeazzo II Visconti, Lord of Milan.
3. John (1338–1348), died of Black Death
4. Catherine (1341), died young
5. Louis (b. 24 December 1342), died young

Yolande died on 24 December 1342, in childbirth. Aymon became ill in the following months and died on 22 June 1343. He was buried alongside his wife in a chapel of Hautecombe Abbey.

== Notes ==
Aymon, Count of Savoy House of Savoy Born: 15 December 1291 Died: 22 June 1343
Regnal titles
Preceded by Edward	Count of Savoy; 1329–1343	Succeeded by Amadeus VI
