= Theodore I of Montferrat =

Greek ruler of Italian polity (c. 1290–1338)

Theodore I, Marquis of Montferrat

Marquis of Montferrat
- Reign: 1306–1338
- Predecessor: John I Aleramici
- Successor: John II Palaiologos
- Born: c. 1290; Constantinople (modern-day Istanbul, Turkey)
- Died: 24 April 1338; Trino, Italy
- Noble family: Palaeologus-Montferrat
- Spouse: Argentina Spinola
- Issue: John II, Marquis of Montferrat; Yolande Palaeologina of Montferrat
- Father: Andronikos II Palaiologos
- Mother: Irene of Montferrat

Theodore I Palaiologos or Palaeologus (Greek: Θεόδωρος Παλαιολόγος, full name: Theodoros Komnenos Doukas Angelos Palaiologos) (c. 1290 – 24 April 1338) was Marquis of Montferrat from 1306 until his death.

== Life ==
Theodore was the second son of Emperor Andronikos II Palaiologos and Irene of Montferrat. As the son of a reigning emperor, Theodore was styled Porphyrogennetos ('born-in-the-purple'). Around 1305, Theodore's mother attempted to negotiate a marriage with a sister of the childless Guy II de la Roche so that Theodore would inherit the Duchy of Athens.

However, when his uncle John I died in 1305, the male line of the Aleramici marquises of Montferrat became extinct. The March of Montferrat was passed to Irene's children. Patriarch Athanasius I of Constantinople blocked the candidacy of the elder son John, so Theodore went to Italy instead.

Theodore sailed to Genoa in 1306. In 1307 he married Argentina Spinola, daughter of Genoese magnate Opicino Spinola, Capitano del Popolo (co-ruler) of the Republic of Genoa. Spinola used his wealth to back Theodore's claim to Montferrat.

Theodore was opposed by Manfred IV of Saluzzo. Manfred was a vassal of the House of Savoy, and several marquises of Montferrat had Savoyard wives. King Charles II of Naples also claimed parts of the march. He gradually overcame these foes and secured the whole march. In 1310 he received the imperial investiture from Emperor Henry VII.

Theodore died in Trino Vercellese in 1338. He was succeeded by his son John II Palaiologos.

== Marriage and issue ==
Theodore and Argentina had:

- Yolande (1318–1342), who married Aimone, Count of Savoy
- John ΙΙ (1321–1372)

== Writings ==
Theodore is known to have authored an original military manual, titled Les Enseignemens ou Ordenances pour un Siegneur qui a Guerres et Grans Gouvernemens a Faire, often referred to as Les enseignements. Originally composed in Greek in 1326-1327 while Theodore was in Constantinople, it exists now only in the medieval French translation of Jean de Vignay. The work is one of the most interesting medieval military manuals in that it is not dependent on Vegetius' De Re Militari or any other known classical text. It thus serves as an example of the military thinking of the late Byzantine and medieval worlds.

== Ancestors ==
Ancestors of Theodore I Palaiologos, Marquis of Montferrat

8. Andronikos Doukas Komnenos Palaiologos
4. Michael VIII Palaiologos
9. Theodora Angelina Palaiologina
2. Andronikos II Palaiologos
10. John Doukas
5. Theodora Palaiologina
11. Eudokia Angelina
1. Theodore I Palaeologos
12. Boniface II, Marquis of Montferrat
6. William VII, Marquis of Montferrat
13. Margaret of Savoy
3. Irene of Montferrat
14. Alfonso X of Castile and León
7. Beatrice of Castile
15. Violant of Aragon

== Sources ==
- Valsecchi, Chiara (2018). "Consilia and Dynastic Successions in Modern Europe". In Villata, Maria Gigliola di Renzo (ed.). Succession Law, Practice and Society in Europe across the Centuries. Springer. p. 417-472.

Theodore I of Montferrat Palaeologus-Montferrat Cadet branch of the Palaiologos dynasty Born: c. 1290 Died: 24 April 1338
Regnal titles
Preceded by John I	Marquis of Montferrat; 1306–1338	Succeeded by John II
