= March of Montferrat =

Former state in Northern Italy

Margraviate of Montferrat Marchesato del Monferrato (Italian)
- 967–1574
- Flag Coat of arms (William IX)

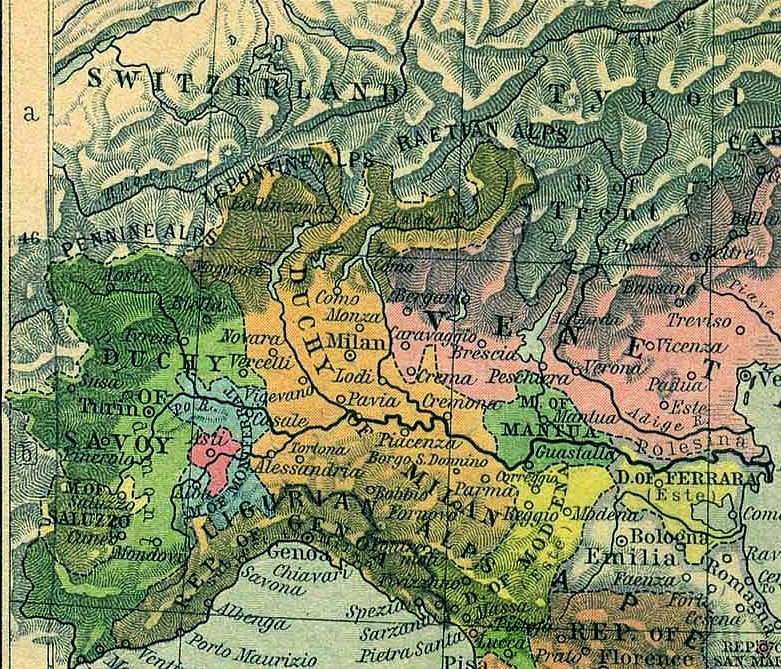
- The March of Montferrat (blue) in 1494
- Status: March of the Kingdom of Italy; State of the Holy Roman Empire
- Capital: Casale Monferrato; 45°08′N 08°27′E (from 1305)
- Common languages: Piedmontese
- Government: Monarchy
- Marquess
  - 967–991: Aleramo (first)
  - 1550–1574: William X (last)
- History
  - Established: 967
  - End of Aleramici rule: 1305
  - Inherited by the House of Gonzaga: 1536
  - Raised to Duchy of Montferrat: 1574
Preceded by	Succeeded by
Piedmont	Duchy of Montferrat

The March (also margraviate or marquisate) of Montferrat was a frontier march of the Kingdom of Italy during the Middle Ages and a state of the Holy Roman Empire. The margraviate was raised to become the Duchy of Montferrat in 1574.

Originally part of the March of Western Liguria (Marca Liguriae Occidentalis) established by King Berengar II about 950, the area of Montferrat was constituted as the marca Aleramica ("Aleramic march") for his son-in-law Aleramo. The earliest secure documentation of Aleramo and his immediate family is derived from the founding charter of the Abbey of Grazzano in 961, occasioned by the recent death of Aleramo's son Gugliemo.

After King Otto I of Germany invaded Italy in 961 and displaced Berengar II, he continued, in a manner much like his predecessors to redefine the great fiefs of Italy. He continued the work that had been done to organize the northwest into three great marches. In the Eastern Liguria territory known as marca Obertenga, Otto returned Oberto Obizzo to his lands and appointed him the margrave of the newly created March of Genoa. In the Turin territory known as the marca Arduinica, Otto returned management to Arduin Glaber and then in 964 Otto appointed Arduin margrave of the newly created March of Turin. And finally in the Western Liguria territory known as marca Aleramica, Otto confirmed Aleramo's titles and position and then in 967 Otto appointed Aleramo margrave of the newly created March of Montferrat.

Aleramo's descendants were relatively obscure until the time of Marquess Rainier in the early twelfth century. About 1133 Rainier's son Marquess William V married Judith of Babenberg, a half-sister of King Conrad III of Germany, and so greatly increased his family's prestige. He entered into the Italian policies of Conrad and the Byzantine Emperor Manuel I Komnenos, setting a Ghibelline precedent for his successors, and with his sons became involved in the Crusades.

Marquess Boniface I was the leader of the Fourth Crusade and established the Kingdom of Thessalonica in the Latin Empire of Greece. Reuniting Thessalonica, inherited by Boniface's Greek son Demetrius, with Montferrat became a goal of Boniface's Italian heirs, though nothing ever came of their endeavours.

In the thirteenth century, Montferrat became embroiled in the conflict between the Guelph and Ghibelline parties under Boniface II and William VII. It had to wage several long wars against the independence-minded communes of Asti and Alessandria and it became the standard-bearer of a renewed Lombard League which was forged to fight the spread of Angevin influence into northern Italy. The capital of Montferrat at this time was Chivasso, the centre of the margraves' power.

In 1305, the last Aleramici margrave died and Montferrat was inherited by the Greek imperial Palaiologos dynasty, who held it until 1533, during a period of diminishing territoriality. In that year, Montferrat was seized by the Spanish under Emperor Charles V of Habsburg, who restored it to Federico II, Duke of Mantua from the House of Gonzaga in 1536. His son Margrave William X was elevated to a Duke of Montferrat in 1574 and the "march" ceased to exist as an entity, though it had already undergone the significant change from a feudal collection of frontier counties to one of the petty states of Renaissance Italy, divided into two separated territories.

== Literary references ==
In Act I, Scene ii of William Shakespeare's The Merchant of Venice, Nerissa makes reference to Bassanio having previously visited Portia's home of Belmont as a Venetian soldier accompanying "the Marquis of Montferrat":

NERISSA Do you not remember, lady, in your father's time, a Venetian, a scholar and a soldier, that came hither in company of the Marquis of Montferrat?

— The Merchant of Venice, Act I, Scene ii

== See also ==
- List of rulers of Montferrat, for a list of margraves and dukes
- Iudiciaria Torrensis
- Duchy of Montferrat

== Sources ==
- Haberstumpf, Walter (2009). Regesti dei Marchesi di Monferrato (secoli IX-XVI). Alessandria: San Giorgio Editrice. ISBN 9788876790935.
- Ruggiero, Michele (1979). Storia del Piemonte. Torino: Piemonte in Bancarella.
