= Opicino Spinola =

Opizzino Spinola
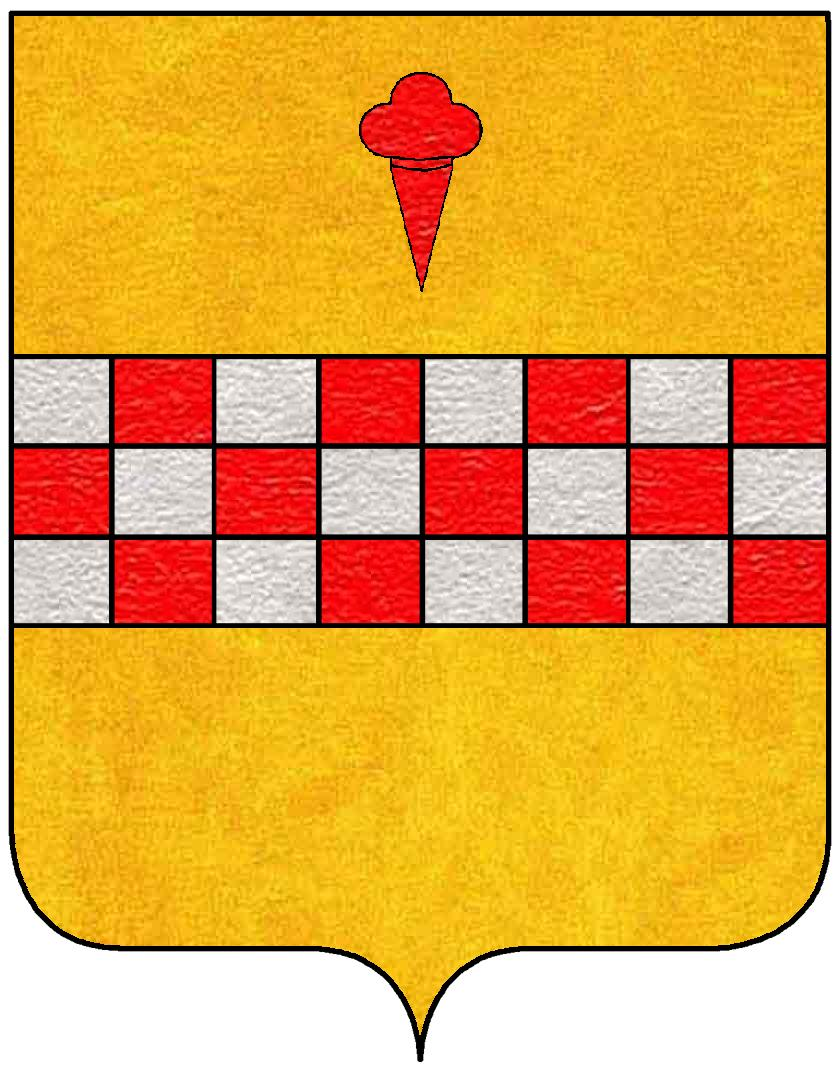

Capitano del Popolo of the Republic of Genoa
- In office 1306–1306
- Preceded by: Lamba Doria
- Succeeded by: Bernabò Doria
- In office 1306–1309
- Preceded by: Bernabò Doria
- Succeeded by: Bernabò Doria
- In office 1309–1310
- Preceded by: Bernabò Doria
- Succeeded by: Carlo Fieschi

Personal details
- Born: 13th century Europe
- Died: 1317 Genoa, Republic of Genoa
- Spouse: Violante di Saluzzo
- Children: Argentina Spinola
- Relatives: House of Spinola
- Profession: Politician, Merchant

Opicino Spinola also called Opizzino Spinola (13th century–1317) was a merchant and political leader in the Republic of Genoa in the early 14th century. He was a member of the Spinola Family and one of the richest men in Genoa.

In January 1306, the citizens of Genoa replaced their Podesta with two Capitani del Popolo ("Captains of the People") as rulers of the republic, part of a constitutional struggle lasting from 1257 to 1339. Thanks to his wealth, Spinola was elected one of the Captains.

== Life and career ==
Opizzino Spinola was the son of Corrado Spinola (d. 1304), the capitano del popolo from 1295 to 1299 (served along with Corrado Doria and later with Lamba Doria), and Argentina Fieschi of Opizzo. His grandfather was Oberto Spinola, who served as capitano del popolo from 1270 to 1291, alongside Oberto Doria and later with Oberto's son Corrado, governing the Genoese Commune at the height of its political power.

In 1306, Opizzino was elected Captain of the People of Genoa alongside Bernabò Doria. That same year, his only daughter, Argentina, married Theodore Palaiologos, the son of Byzantine Emperor Andronikos II Palaiologos, who had been granted the title of Marquess of Montferrat. Opizzino supported Theodore in overcoming his rivals.

In 1308, Spinola proclaimed himself sole perpetual captain, imprisoning Bernabò Doria, who later managed to escape. With this move, he attempted to establish a personal lordship over Genoa. However, in the following year, he was defeated by the opposing factions (the Dorias, the Fieschis, and the Grimaldis) in the Battle of Sestri Ponente. As a result, Opizzino was banished from Genoa, though he continued to seek ways to reclaim power.

During the subsequent conflicts, the Genoese forces destroyed Busalla, considered a stronghold of the Spinolas, but Opizzino retaliated by destroying Montaldo and Voltaggio, thus forcing the Genoese to negotiate.

Finally, in 1311, he returned to Genoa alongside Emperor Henry VII, who had come to Italy for his imperial coronation. In July 1313, he was granted investiture over several fiefs in the Oltregiogo region, including Arquata, Serravalle, Stazzano, Pasturana, Castelletto d'Orba, San Cristoforo, Cremonte, the castle and lands of Valle Scrivia, and the grange of Bisio. This formal recognition secured imperial status for all these fiefs, granting them privileges and excluding future interference from the communes of Genoa and Tortona. This buffer state between Genoa and neighboring states—also comprising other territories owned by the Spinola family but not directly granted to Opizzino in 1313—persisted through various political shifts until 1797, when the remaining fiefs were annexed to the Ligurian Republic.

After Henry VII's death, Opizzino and the Spinola family were once again expelled from Genoa. In 1315, they were besieged and defeated in Busalla, which was destroyed for the second time in a few years. However, the following year, the Spinolas launched a new campaign in the Polcevera Valley against Pontedecimo, which was razed to the ground in retaliation.

Opizzino died of fever in Serravalle Scrivia in 1317, as recorded by the *Chronicle of Benvenuto da Sangiorgio*. He left only the rights to that fief to his daughter Argentina, while the other lands he had been granted passed to his relatives.

A statue representing him still stands on the façade of the Palazzo Spinola dei Marmi in Piazza delle Fontane Marose.

== Children and relatives ==
In 1307, Spinola had a daughter with Violante of Saluzzo, the daughter of Thomas I of Saluzzo, named Argentina Spinola, she was married to Theodore Palaiologos, who claimed the March of Montferrat in succession to his maternal uncle. Spinola used his wealth to establish Theodore in power.

Spinola's co-Captain Bernabo Doria was the father-in-law of Manfred IV, Marquess of Saluzzo, who claimed some of the territory of Montferrat. This led to conflicts between Spinola and Doria. In 1310, Spinola managed to get himself appointed the sole Captain of the People for life.

However, his growing power made enemies, including even some of his Spinola kinsmen. In late 1310, he was forced from office; in 1311 the Podesta was restored, and Spinola was placed under perpetual banishment from Genoa.

== Sources ==
- Epstain, Steve. Genoa and the Genoese. p. 325.
- Malleson, George Bruce. Studies in Genoese History. p. 300
- Caro, Georg. Genova e la supremazia nel Mediterraneo, Genova 1975.
- Tacchella, Lorenzo. Busalla e la Valle Scrivia nella storia, Verona 1980.
