= List of rulers of Montferrat =

Overview of rulers of the Marquisiate of Montferrat

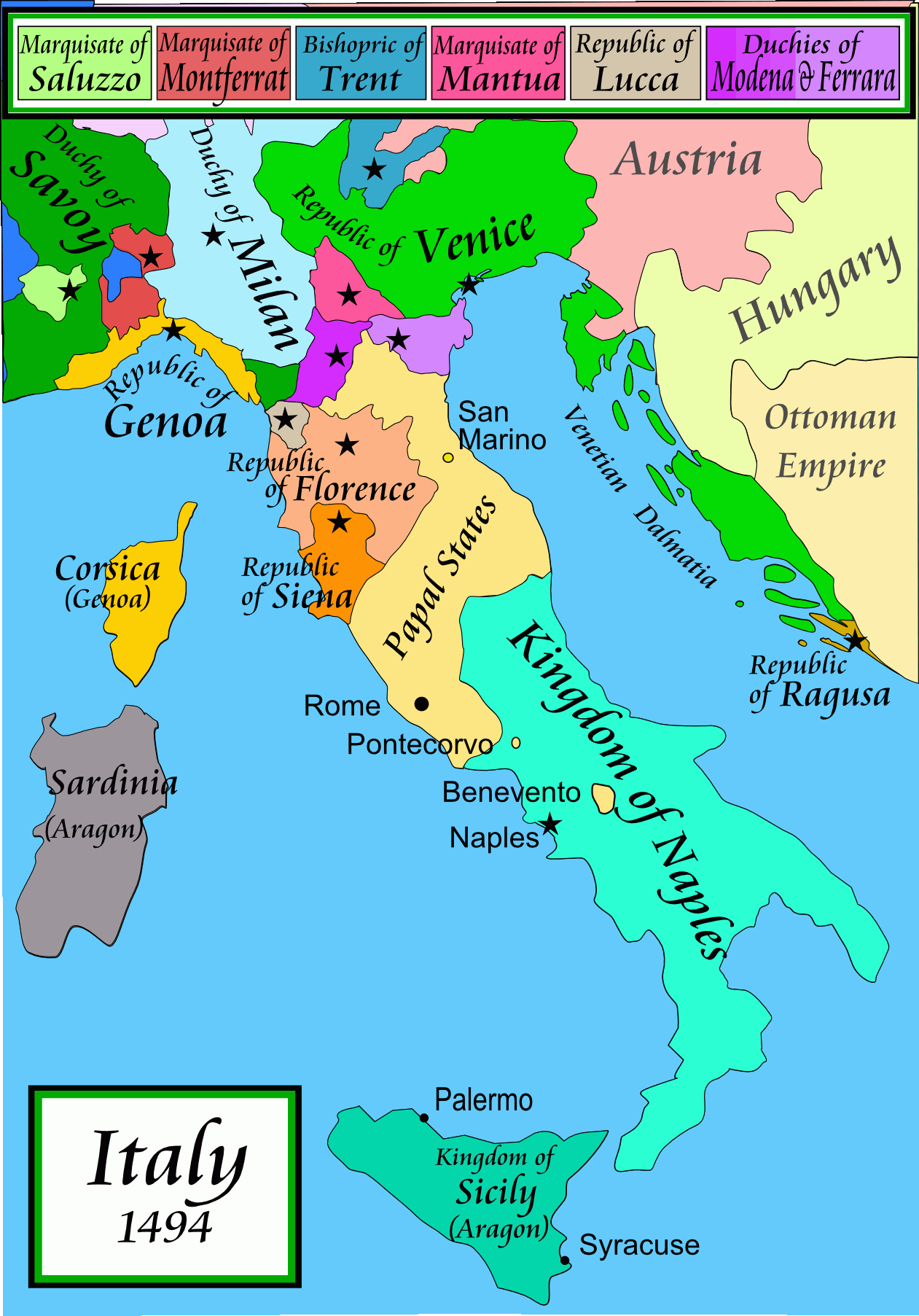
The Marquisate of Montferrat (in brick red) in the context of late 15th century Italy.

Arms of Montferrat (House of Aleramici): Argent a chief gules.

The marquises and dukes of Montferrat were the rulers of a territory in Piedmont south of the Po and east of Turin. The March of Montferrat was created by Berengar II of Italy in 950 during a redistribution of power in the northwest of his kingdom. It was originally named after and held by the Aleramici. In 1574, Montferrat was raised to a duchy by Emperor Maximilian II (see Duchy of Montferrat).

== Marquises ==
=== Aleramici dynasty ===
- William I (d. 933 or before)
- Aleramo (933–967)
  - William II, son and co-ruler
- Otto I (967–991), son
- William III (991 – bef. 1042), son
- Otto II (bef. 1042 – c. 1084), son
  - Henry (d. 1045), brother and co-ruler
- William IV (c. 1084 – c. 1100), son
- Rainier (c. 1100 – c. 1136), son
- William V (c. 1136–1191), son
- Conrad (1191–1192), son
- Boniface I (1192–1207), brother
- William VI (1207–1225), son
- Boniface II (1225–1253/55), son
- William VII (1253/55–1292), son
- John I (1292–1305), son

=== Paleologo dynasty ===
- Theodore I (1306–1338), nephew of John
- John II (1338–1372), son
- Secondotto, also known as Otto III (1372–1378), son
- John III (1378–1381), brother
- Theodore II (1381–1418), brother
- John Jacob (1418–1445), son
- John IV (1445–1464), son
- William VIII (1464–1483), brother
- Boniface III (1483–1494), brother
- William IX (1494–1518), son. (Father-in-law to Federico II, Duke of Mantua.)
- Boniface IV (1518–1530), son, under the regency of his mother Anne of Alençon
- John George (1530–1533), uncle
  - Spanish occupation until 1536.
- Margaret of Montferrat (1533–1536), daughter of William IX and Anne of Alençon, and Marchioness of Montferrat in her own right.

=== Gonzaga dynasty ===
In 1536 Charles V, Holy Roman Emperor granted the marquisate, despite competing claims from Savoy and from the Marquis of Saluzzo, to the Gonzagas. This was confirmed in 1559 by the Peace of Cateau-Cambrésis.

- Frederick Gonzaga (1536–1540), Duke of Mantua. Married to Margaret of Montferrat, daughter of William IX and Anne of Alençon, and Marchioness of Montferrat in her own right.
- Francis I (1540–1550), Duke of Mantua, Marquis of Montferrat. Son of Margaret of Montferrat and Frederick Gonzaga.
- Guglielmo I Gonzaga (1550–1574), Duke of Mantua, Marquis until 1574, then duke. Son of Margaret of Montferrat and Frederick Gonzaga

== Dukes ==
=== Gonzaga dynasty ===
- William X (1574–1587), Duke of Mantua, Duke of Montferrat from 1574, previously marquis
- Vincent I (1587–1612), Duke of Mantua and Montferrat. Son of William X
- Francis II (1612), Duke of Mantua and Montferrat. Son of Vincent I
- Ferdinand (1612–26), Duke of Mantua and Montferrat. Son of Vincent I.
- Vincent II (1626–27), Duke of Mantua and Montferrat. Son of Vincent I.
- War of the Mantuan Succession (1627–1631) – a portion was lost to Duchy of Savoy
- Maria, Duchess of Montferrat 1612–60, also Duchess of Mantua 1627–1631. Daughter of Francis II.
- Charles I, called "of Nevers", Duke of Montferrat (1627–1637), also Duke of Mantua and Nevers. Father-in-law of Maria, co-ruler with Maria and his son, Charles.
- Charles II (1637–1665). Also Duke of Nevers until 1659. Son of Maria, grandson of both Charles I and Francis II.
- Ferdinand Charles (1665–1708), Duke of Montferrat and Mantua. Son of Charles II.

=== Savoy dynasty ===
The House of Savoy gained part of the duchy after the War of the Mantuan Succession and the remainder in 1708. The head of the family used the title of Duke of Montferrat from 1631 until 1861. In addition, the title was granted to some younger sons of the House:

- Prince Amadeus, Duke of Montferrat (1754–1755), second son of Victor Amadeus III of Sardinia
- Prince Maurizio, Duke of Montferrat (1762–1799) third son of Victor Amadeus III
- Prince Oddone, Duke of Montferrat (1846–1866), third son of Victor Emmanuel II of Italy.

== Bibliography ==
- Haberstumpf, Walter (2009). Regesti dei Marchesi di Monferrato (secoli IX-XVI). Alessandria: San Giorgio Editrice. ISBN 9788876790935.
- Circolo Culturale I Marchesi del Monferrato (external link to website devoted to dynastic history)
- Haberstumpf, Walter. Dinastie europee nel Mediterraneo orientale. I Monferrato e i Savoia nei secoli XII–XV, 1995 (external link to downloadable text).
- The Margraves of Montferrat and Kings of Thessalonica, 961–1573 AD
- Usseglio, Leopoldo. I Marchesi di Monferrato in Italia ed in Oriente durante i secoli XII e XIII, 1926.
