= William of Montferrat =

William of Montferrat is the name of:

- William I of Montferrat (d. before 933)
- William II of Montferrat (died probably around 961)
- William III of Montferrat (991 – bef.1042), son of Otho I
- William IV of Montferrat (c.1084–c.1100)
- William V of Montferrat (c.1136–1191)
- William Longsword of Montferrat (c. 1140–1177)
- William VI of Montferrat, (1207–1225)
- William of Montferrat (monk), 13th century
- William VII of Montferrat (c.1255–1292), titular king of Thessalonica
- William VIII of Montferrat (1464–1483)
- William IX of Montferrat (1494–1518), see Casale Monferrato
- William X of Montferrat, 1st duke of Montferrat, Duke of Mantua
