= Otto I of Montferrat =

Italian noble (d. 991)

Otto I, Marquis of Montferrat

Marquis of Montferrat
- Reign: 967 – 991
- Predecessor: Aleram
- Successor: William III
- Died: 991
- Issue: William III; Riprando; Otta; Waldrada
- House: Aleramici
- Father: Aleram
- Mother: Adelaide

Otto I (also Otho or Ottone; died 991) was the second Marquis of Montferrat briefly following his father Aleram on the throne.

== Life ==
Otto was the son of Aleram and his first wife. Notably obscure, he did not appear with his parents and his younger brother Anselm at the foundation of the monastery of Grazzano in 961. On Aleram's death in 967, the large marca Aleramica was broken up: Montferrat went to Otto and Liguria to Anselm. Their elder brother William II had already deceased.

In his own lifetime, Otto does not appear in any document with the margravial title, but he appears in the documents of later generations cited as such. He appears in a confirmation of the possessions of the abbacy of Fruttuaria with the title in a patronymic. He probably never used the title in life, but his descendants retroactively applied it to him, as he held the same post as they.

Otto died in 991, as known by the foundation act of his son for the monastery of Spigno, which Otto himself had planned on building. By his wife, whose name is lost, he left two sons: an eldest named William III, who succeeded him, and younger named Riprando. He also left two daughters, Otta and Waldrada (Gualderada).

== References and Notes ==
Preceded by Aleram	Marquis of Montferrat; 991	Succeeded by William III
