= Master of Crea =

Italian painter

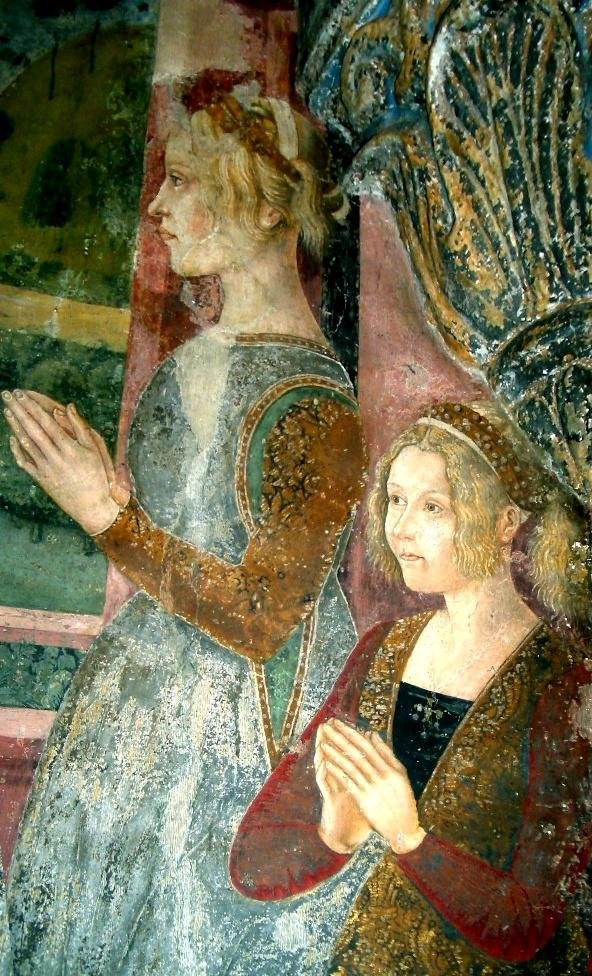
Rear wall of the chapel, detail of the daughters of Guglielmo VIII Paleologo

Maestro della Cappella di Santa Margherita a Crea, or more simply Maestro di Crea, is the name given to the anonymous Italian painter who was engaged by Guglielmo VIII Paleologo, Marquis of Montferrat, to decorate the chapel of Santa Margherita in the Santuario della Madonna di Crea near Serralunga di Crea (Province of Alessandria, Piedmont, Italy). The work was performed during the years 1474–1479. The sanctuary stands on the highest hill of the Basso Monferrato; later it would form the focal pont of the Sacro Monte di Crea.

The Master of Crea has in the past been identified with various known painters from north-west Italy, and particularly with Macrino d'Alba. However, stylistic similarities with the early work of the Casalese painter Giovanni Martino Spanzotti have led today's experts to identify him with that painter's father, Pietro, or (more probably) with his brother, Francesco.

== The chapel frescos ==
On the rear wall of the chapel is a triptych portraying in fresco the Madonna col Bambino ed Angeli musicanti, affiancata da Santi (Virgin and child, with angelic musicians, flanked by saints) and, on the two wings, donor portraits of Guglielmo VIII Paleologo, his wife Maria di Foix and their children.

The side walls depict scenes of torture from the Passio di Santa Margherita di Antiochia (Saint Margaret of Antioch): in one the saint faces trial by fire, in another she is made to stand in a cauldron of boiling water.

On the chapel's vault are images of the four Doctors of the Church.

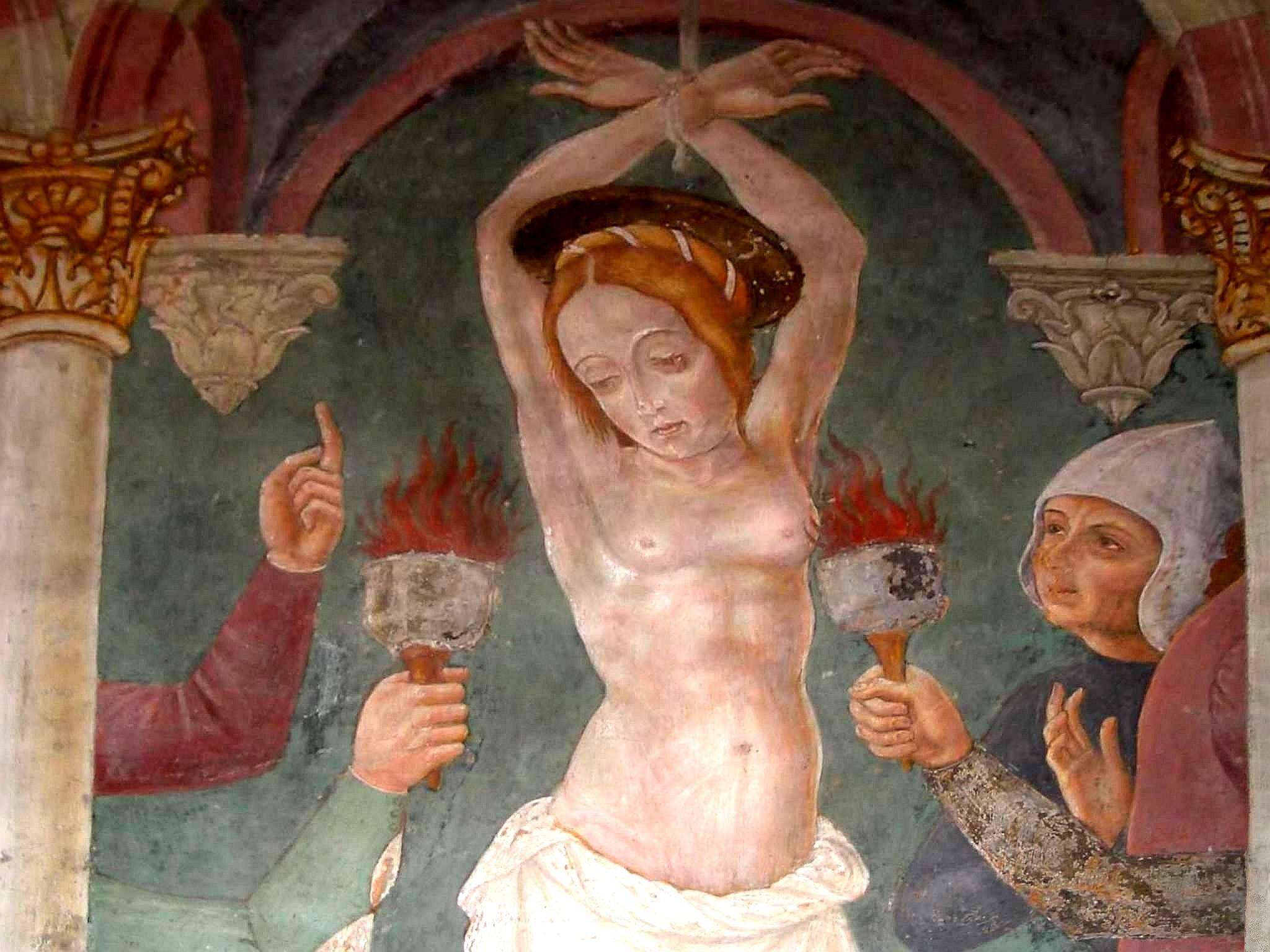

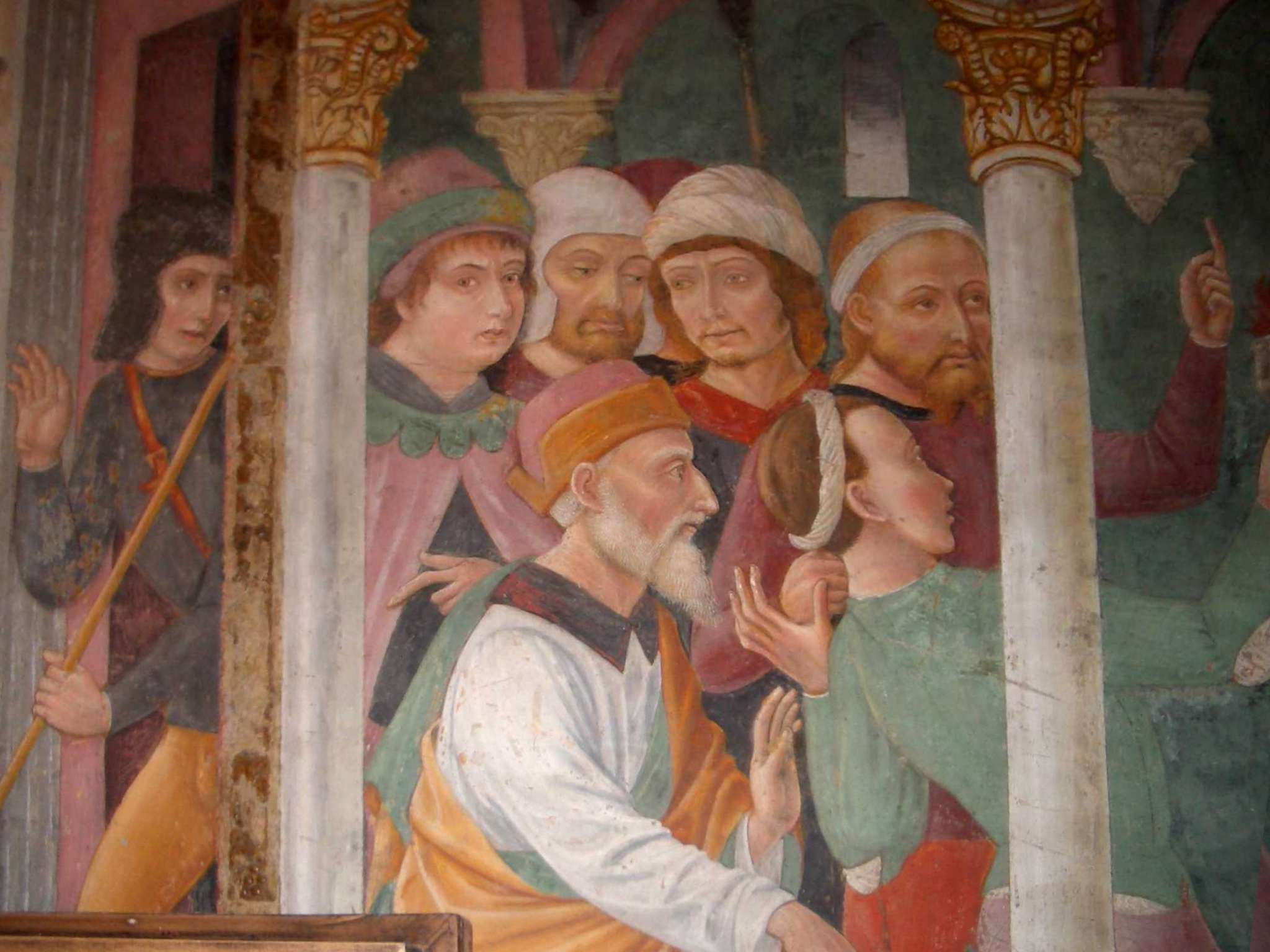

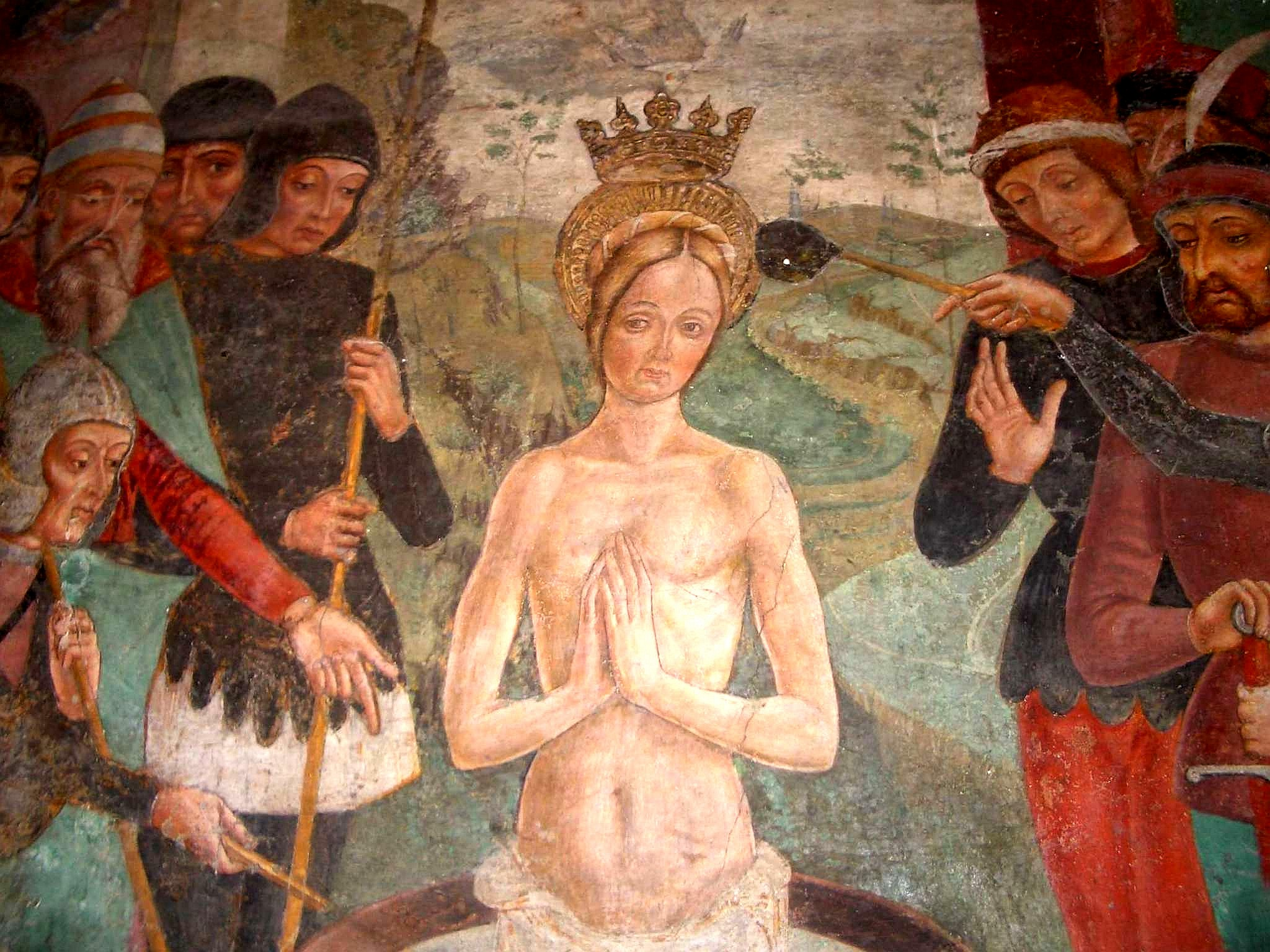

== Other works ==
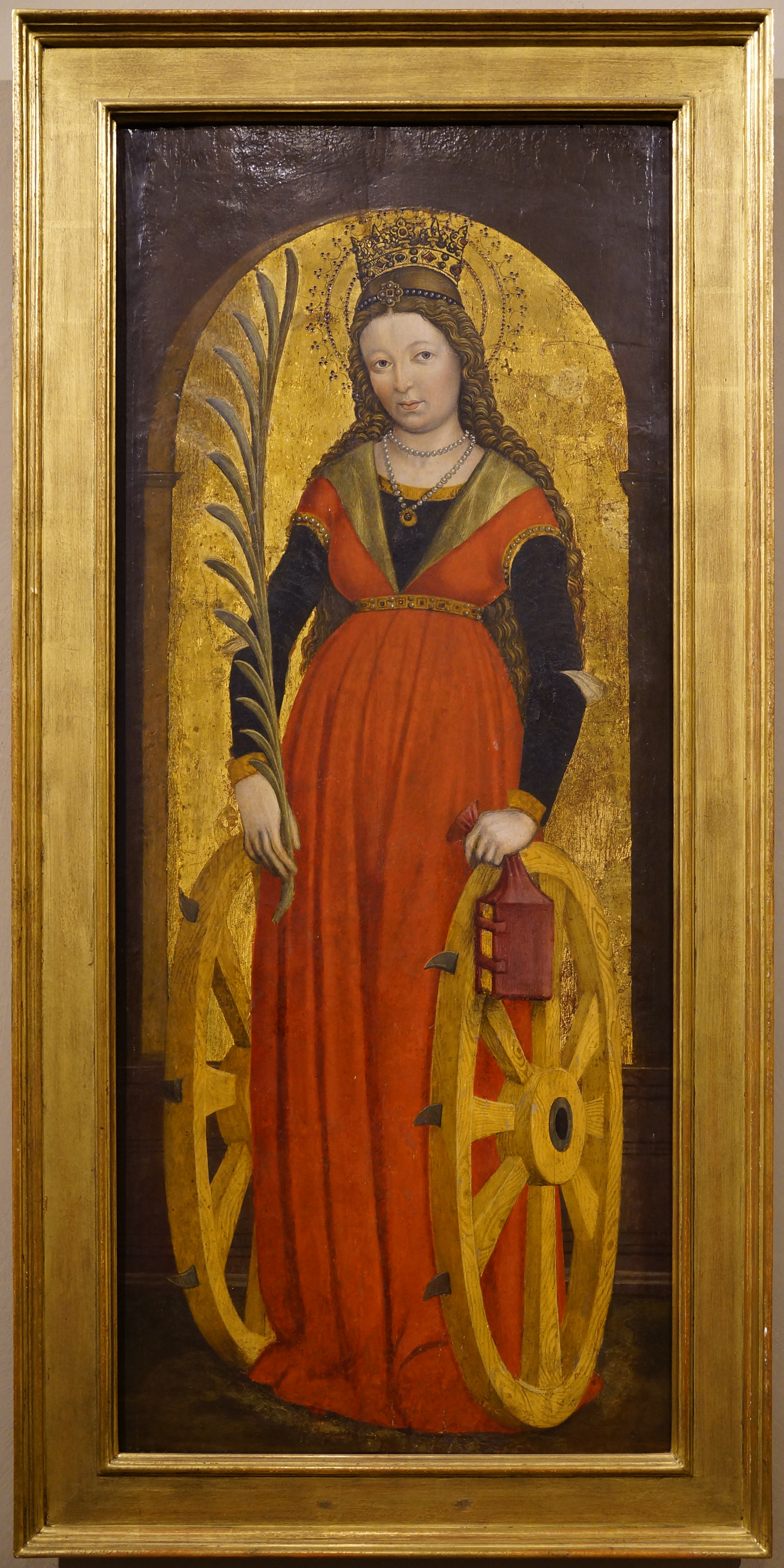
Catherine of Alexandria, with palm branch and girdle book, between two breaking wheels

Other paintings now widely attributed to the Master of Crea include:

- A panel painting of Saint Catherine of Alexandria, Museo Civico d'Arte Antica di Torino, Palazzo Madama;
- The polyptych of Marco Scarognino, Pinacoteca Civica, Varallo Sesia
- The panel painting Adorazione del Bambino con S. Giovanni Battista e S. Domenico, Gemäldegalerie, Berlin;
