= Serralunga =

Serralunga may refer to two comuni in northern Italy:

- Serralunga d'Alba, province of Cuneo
- Serralunga di Crea, province of Alessandria
