= William III of Montferrat =

Marquis of Montferrat and Count of Vado

William III, Marquis of Montferrat

Marquis of Montferrat
- Reign: 991 – 1042
- Predecessor: Otto I
- Successor: Otto II
- Born: c. 972
- Died: 1042 (aged 69–70)
- Spouse: Waza
- Issue: Otto II; Henry
- House: Aleramici
- Father: Otto I

William III (c. 970 – 1042) was the third Marquis of Montferrat and Count of Vado from 991 to his death. He was the eldest son and successor of Otto I. William I and II were the father and son, respectively, of Aleram, the first Marquis, but neither served as Marquis himself.

== Life ==
William's religious policy was a continuation of Aleram's. He founded the monastery of Spigno. In 1014, he and his brother Riprando donated land to the abbey of Fruttuaria. Between his succession and 1002, he made other donations to Acqui Terme.

While following in the familiar policy of ecclesiastical patronage, William abandoned Aleram's support of the Holy Roman Emperors. Instead, he intervened in the wars of the Italian communes which characterised early-eleventh-century Italy. He joined an anti-imperial alliance with Count Obert the Red, Marquis Ulric Manfred II of Turin, and Bishop Leo of Vercelli. The allies soon found themselves at odds and warring on each other. Leo besieged Santhià, where William was then residing, and William, to avenge himself on the bishop, besieged Vercelli and put it to flame. William signed a peace treaty with Ulric Manfred and married his son Henry to Manfred's daughter Adelaide.

Even after all his allies had been pacified by imperial troops, William continued to resist Conrad II, but he fared poorly. Conrad destroyed his fortress in the valley of Orba.

The Miracula sancti Bononii records William's wife as Waza. She prayed at the tomb of Saint Bononio, abbot of Santissimi Michele e Genuario di Lucedio. William died in 1042, probably before 29 January, when his son Henry cites him in an act donating land to the church in Turin. He succeeded by his elder son Otto II, Marquis of Montferrat.

== Sources ==
- Caravale, Mario (ed). Dizionario Biografico degli Italiani: LX Grosso – Guglielmo da Forlì. Rome, 2003.
- Marchesi di Monferrato: Guglielmo III.

Preceded by Otto I	Marquis of Montferrat; 991–1042	Succeeded by Otto II
