= Giuseppe Rusnati =

Italian sculptor

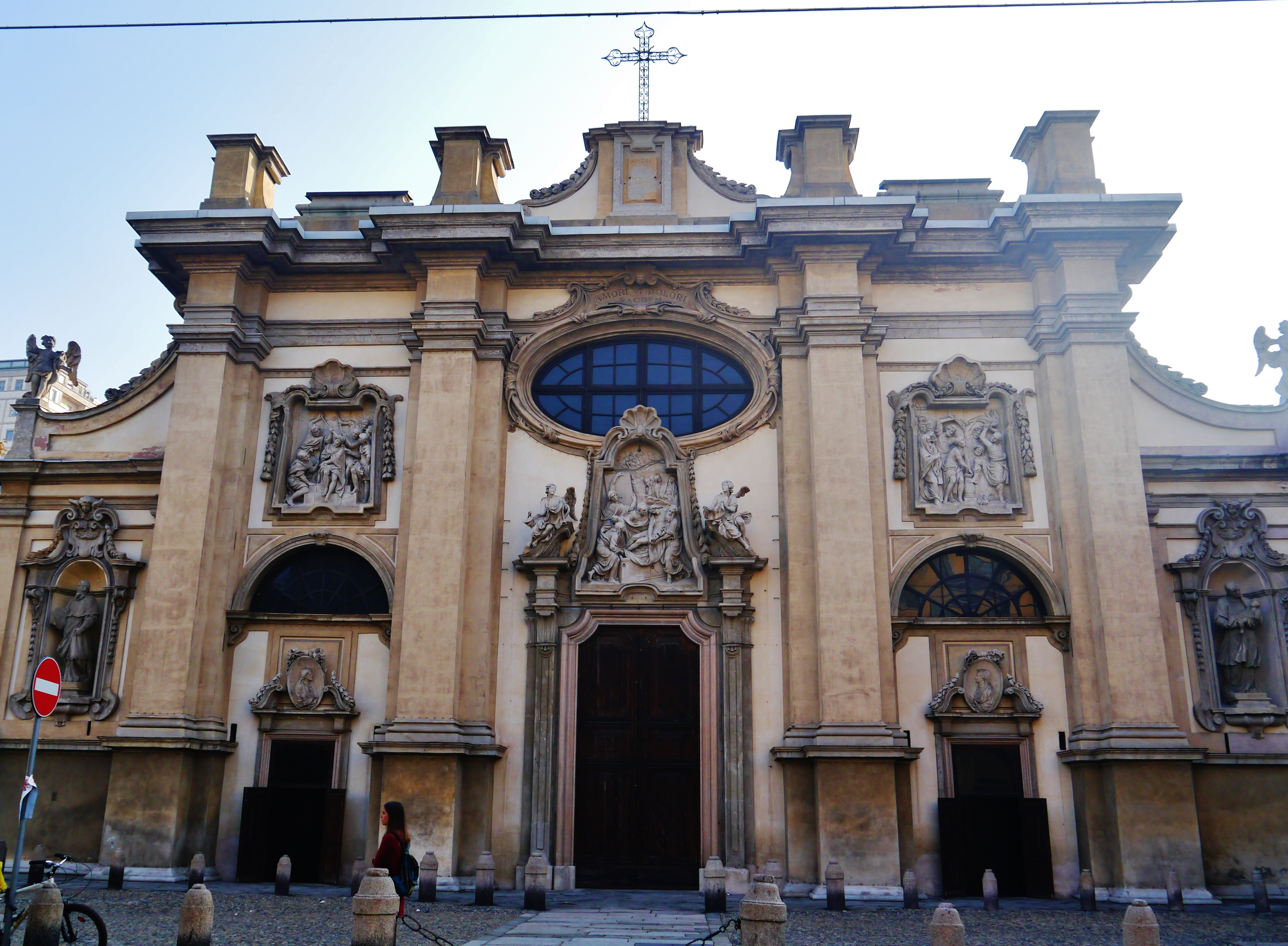

Giuseppe Rusnati (1650, Gallarate, Lombardy - 1713) was a Lombard sculptor of the Rococo period. Known for having trained with Ercole Ferrata and subsequently from 1673 to c. 1686 training a young Camillo Rusconi, prior to the latter's relocation himself to Ferrata's studio in Rome. Born near Como; he died in 1713. He worked for many years for the Duomo of Milan, where he worked along with Giuseppe Buono (1670–1709/21) and Carlo Simonetta (d 1693).

He also contributed to the Certosa di Pavia and sent many sculptures for the Sacri Monti of Piedmont and Lombardy, including to Monte Calvario; to the 9th, 10th, and 15th chapels of Sacred Mount Calvary of Domodossola; to the 13th and 19th chapels of the Sacro Monte di Orta; and the statues of SS Domenico and Francisco in the high altar (1660–1662) for the Sacro Monte di Varese.

The facade of Santa Maria della Passione (seen at right) in Milan is attributed to Rusnati.
