= Montferrat =

Geographic region of northern Italy

Monferrato of the Infernot
UNESCO World Heritage Site
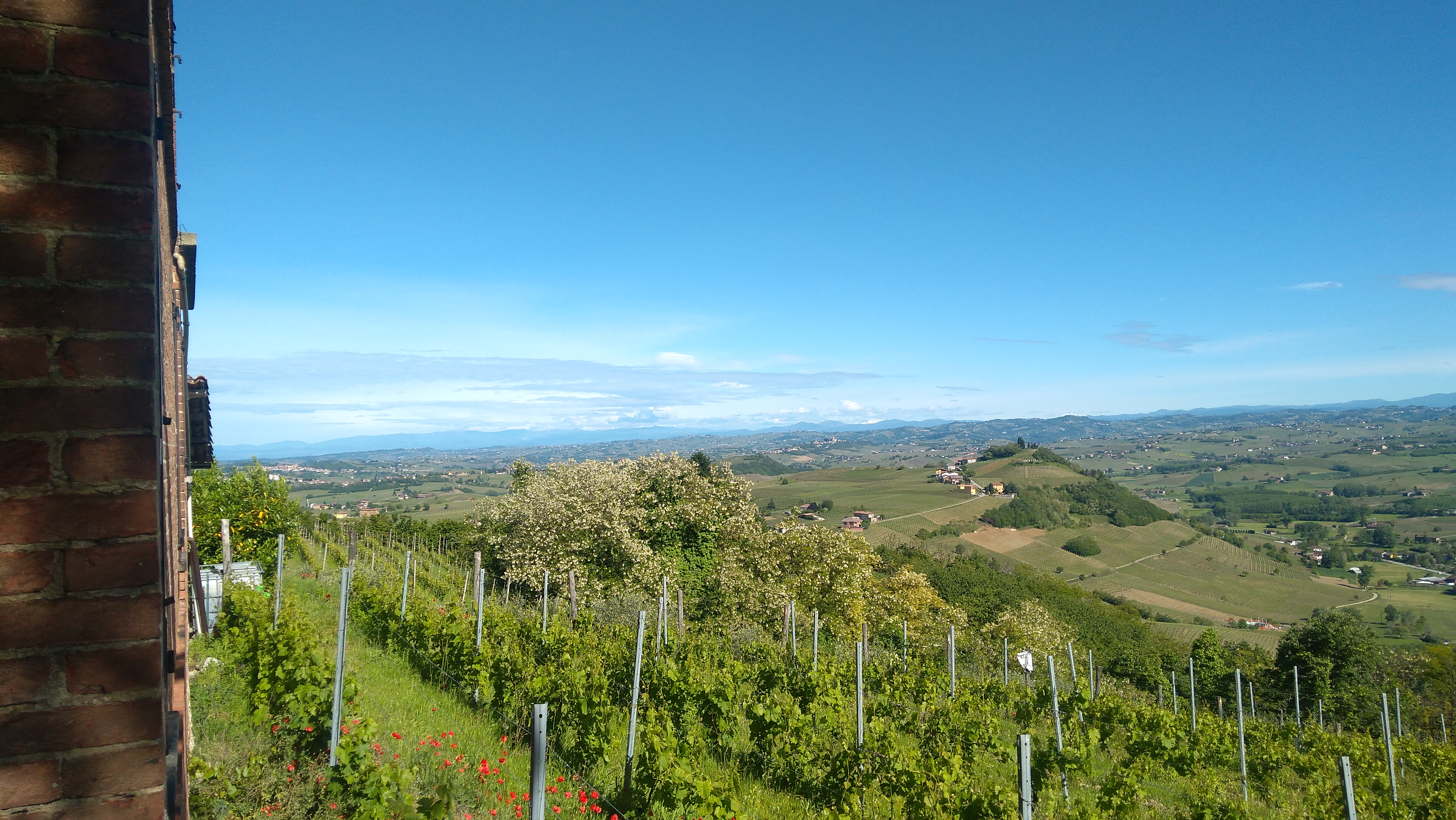

- Location within Italy
- Location: Italy
- Part of: Vineyard Landscape of Piedmont: Langhe-Roero and Monferrato
- Criteria: Cultural: iii, v
- Reference: 1390rev-006
- Inscription: 2014 (38th Session)
- Area: 2,561 ha (6,330 acres)
- Buffer zone: 16,943 ha (41,870 acres)
- Coordinates: 45°3′3″N 8°23′23″E

Flag of Montferrat

Montferrat (UK: /ˌmɒntfəˈræt/ US: /-ˈrɑːt/; Italian: Monferrato [moɱferˈraːto]; Piedmontese: Monfrà, locally [mʊŋˈfrɒ]; Latin: Mons Ferratus) is a historical region of Piedmont, in northern Italy. It comprises roughly (and its extent has varied over time) the modern provinces of Alessandria and Asti. Montferrat is one of the most important wine districts of Italy. It also has a strong literary tradition, including the 18th-century Asti-born poet and dramatist Vittorio Alfieri and the Alessandrian Umberto Eco.

The territory is cut in two by the river Tanaro. The northern part (the Basso Monferrato, "Low Montferrat"), which lies between that river and the Po, is an area of rolling hills and plains. The southern part (the Alto Monferrato, "High Montferrat") rises from the banks of the Tanaro into the mountains of the Apennines and the water divide between Piedmont and Liguria.

On 22 June 2014, Montferrat was declared a UNESCO World Heritage Site.

== History ==
Coat of Arms of Montferrat

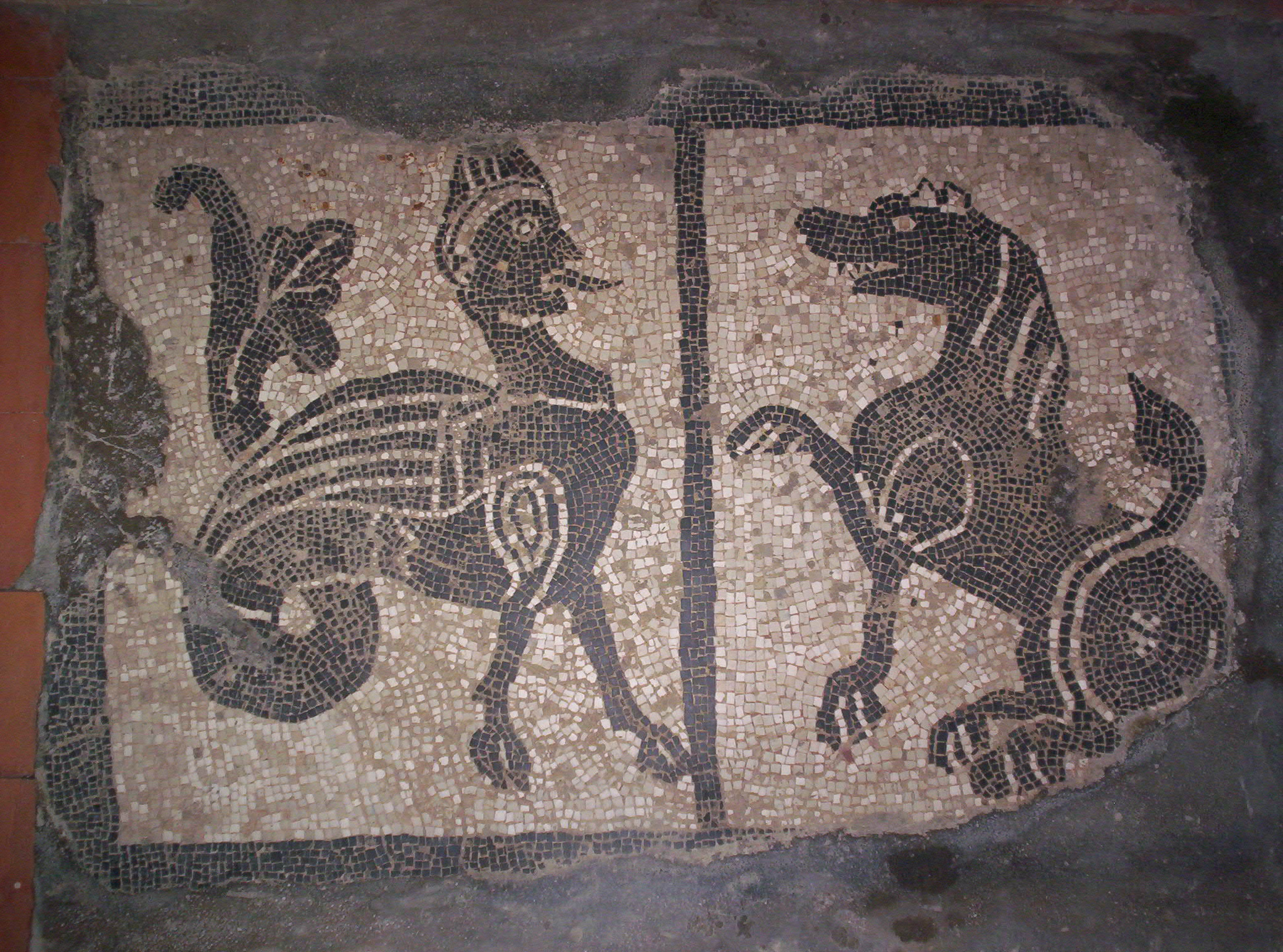
Mosaic of the 10th century lying on the grave of Aleramo, in the Abbey of Grazzano Badoglio

Originally a county, it was elevated to a margravate of the Holy Roman Empire under Count Aleramo in 961, following the transition of power in northern Italy from Berengar of Ivrea to Otto I of Germany. Its marchesi (marquesses) and their family members were related to the Kings of France and the Holy Roman Emperors. Members of the family participated frequently in the Crusades, and intermarried with the royal family of Jerusalem and the Byzantine Imperial families of Comnenus, Angelus and Palaiologos. The March of Montferrat was briefly controlled by Spain (1533–1536) before it passed to the Gonzaga Dukes of Mantua (1536–1708). In 1574, Montferrat was raised to a Duchy by Maximilian II, Holy Roman Emperor. With the War of the Mantuan Succession (1628–1631) a piece of the duchy passed to the Duchy of Savoy, the remainder passing to Savoy in 1708, as Leopold I, Holy Roman Emperor gained possession of the Gonzaga territory. The next heir of the House of Gonzaga was later compensated by giving Duchy of Teschen in Silesia to them.

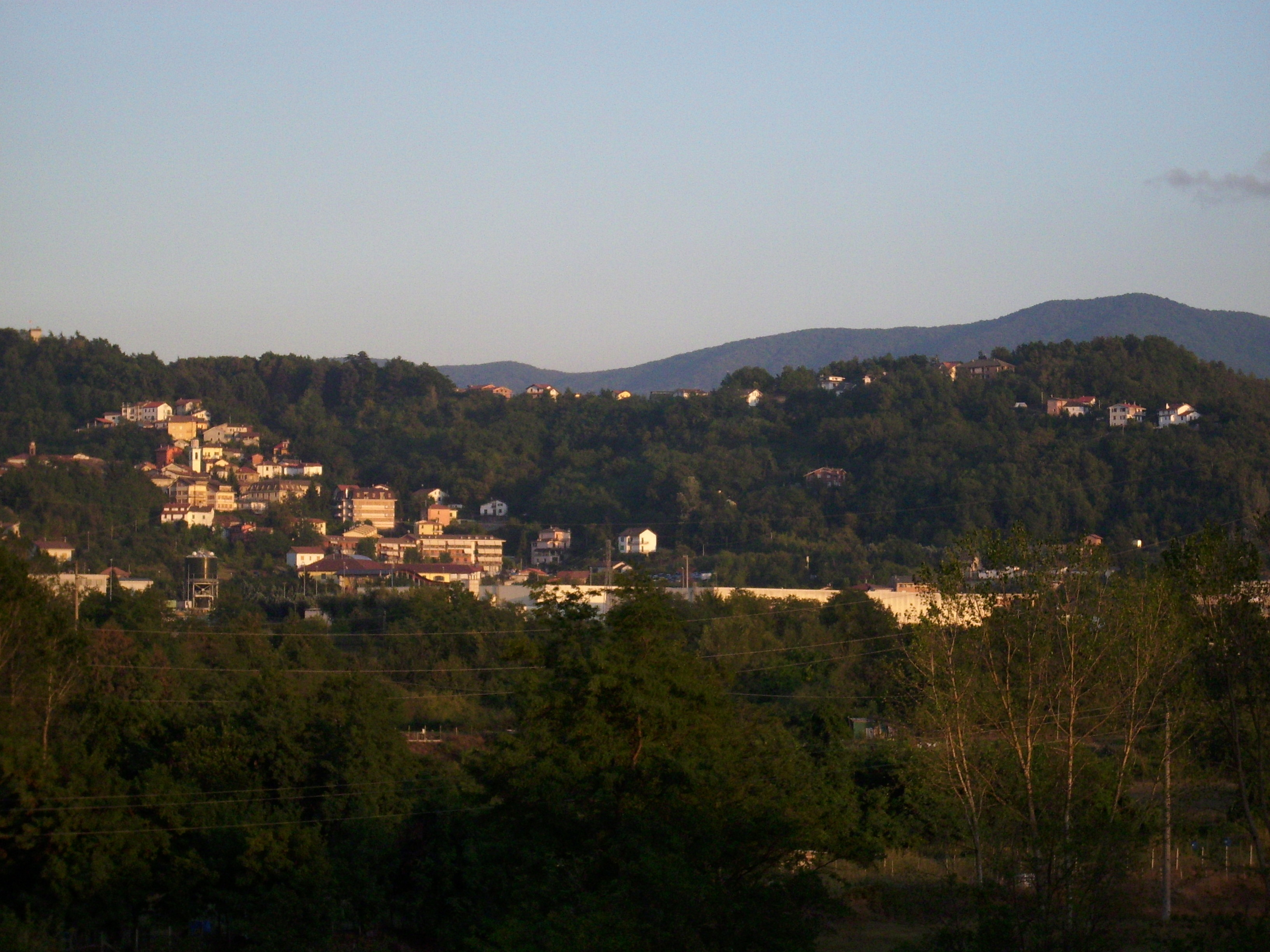
Belforte Monferrato

== Etymology ==
There are various interpretations and assumptions concerning the etymology of Montferrat, but to date none are certain. There are many opinions, with Aldo Ricaldone stating the name was derived from "Mount" and farro — a variety of wheat. Another claim is that it comes from the Latin Mons ferax meaning "fertile and rich mountain". Still another refers to the irons (Latin ferrus) left by the Romans in their conquest, Mons ferratus. Finally, an interpretation derived from a legend according to which Aleramo of Montferrat, the legendary founder of its march, wanting to shoe a horse, and not finding a hammer, used a brick (mon in the local dialect of Piedmontese), and thereby the horse was shod (fra, deriving from the same ferratus mentioned above), hence the name Monfrà yielding Montferrat.

== Geography ==
Map of Montferrat in Piedmont Basso Monferrato Monferrato Astigiano Alto Monferrato

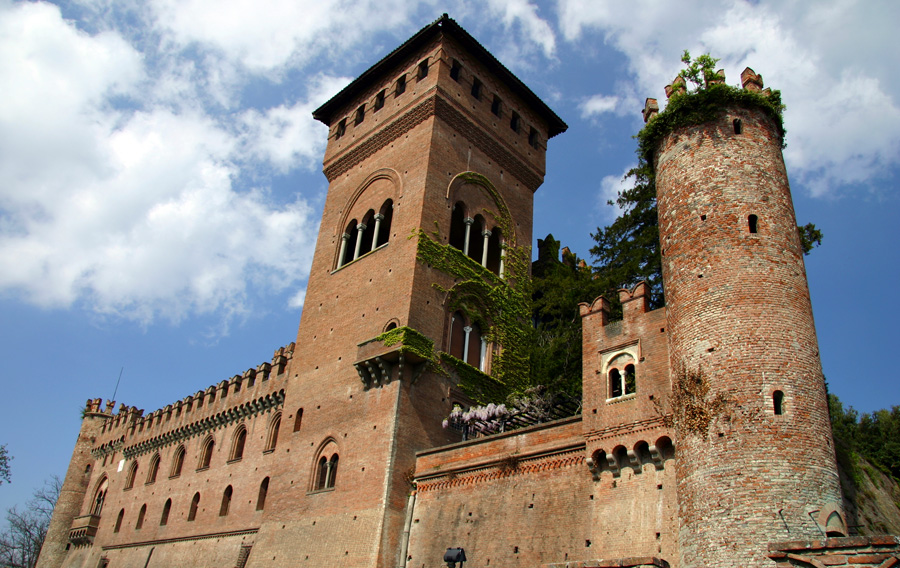
Castle of Gabiano Monferrato

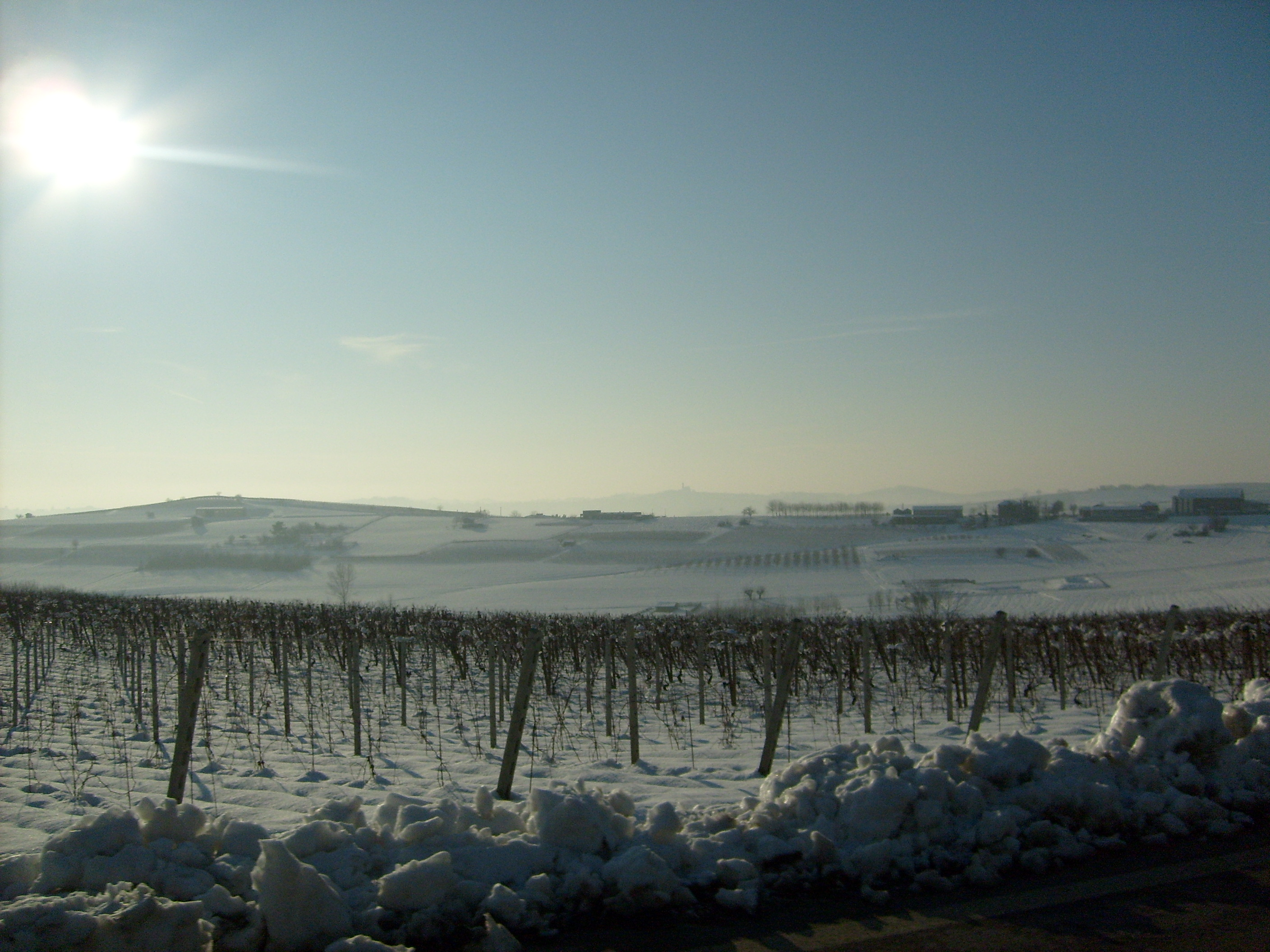
Snowy vineyards in Casalese area

Montferrat can be divided into three main parts:

- Basso Monferrato (low Montferrat) or Casalese is characterized by its soft hills, to the exclusion of the Sacred Mount of Crea (455 m) (Unesco World Heritage), never reach heights of over 400 meters; territorially includes part of the province of Alessandria consisting of the countryside near Casale Monferrato. It is bounded on the north and east by the rivers Po and Tanaro.
- Monferrato Astigiano (Astesan Montferrat): Identifies virtually the entire Province of Asti (with the exception of Langa Astigiana) and is characterized by a hilly conformation and several historic towns such as Nizza Monferrato, Cortanze, Cocconato, Montiglio and Canelli. Asti is the geographical heart of this macro-region, bordered on the south by the valley of the river Belbo and west roughly from the path of the stream Versa and whose right side Asti is located. The highest point of the area is the hill of Albugnano 549 metres above sea level.
- Alto Monferrato (high Montferrat): extending south from the Val Bormida up to lick the foot of the Ligurian region, is bounded to the west by the valley of the Bormida Spigno and east by the western portion of the middle valley Scrivia. The main centre is Acqui Terme.

== Geology ==
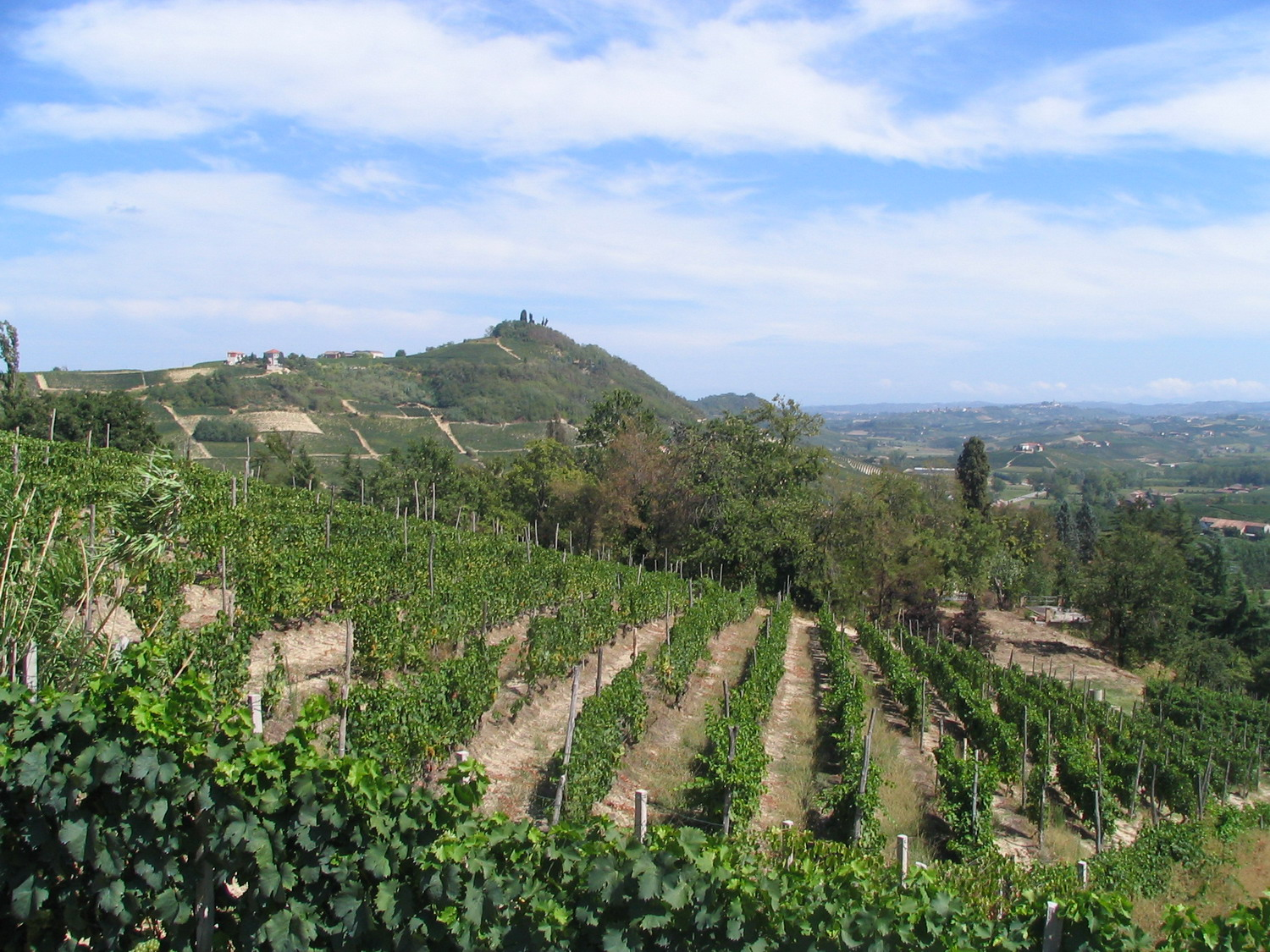
Bricco Lu: the highest point in Costigliole d'Asti area

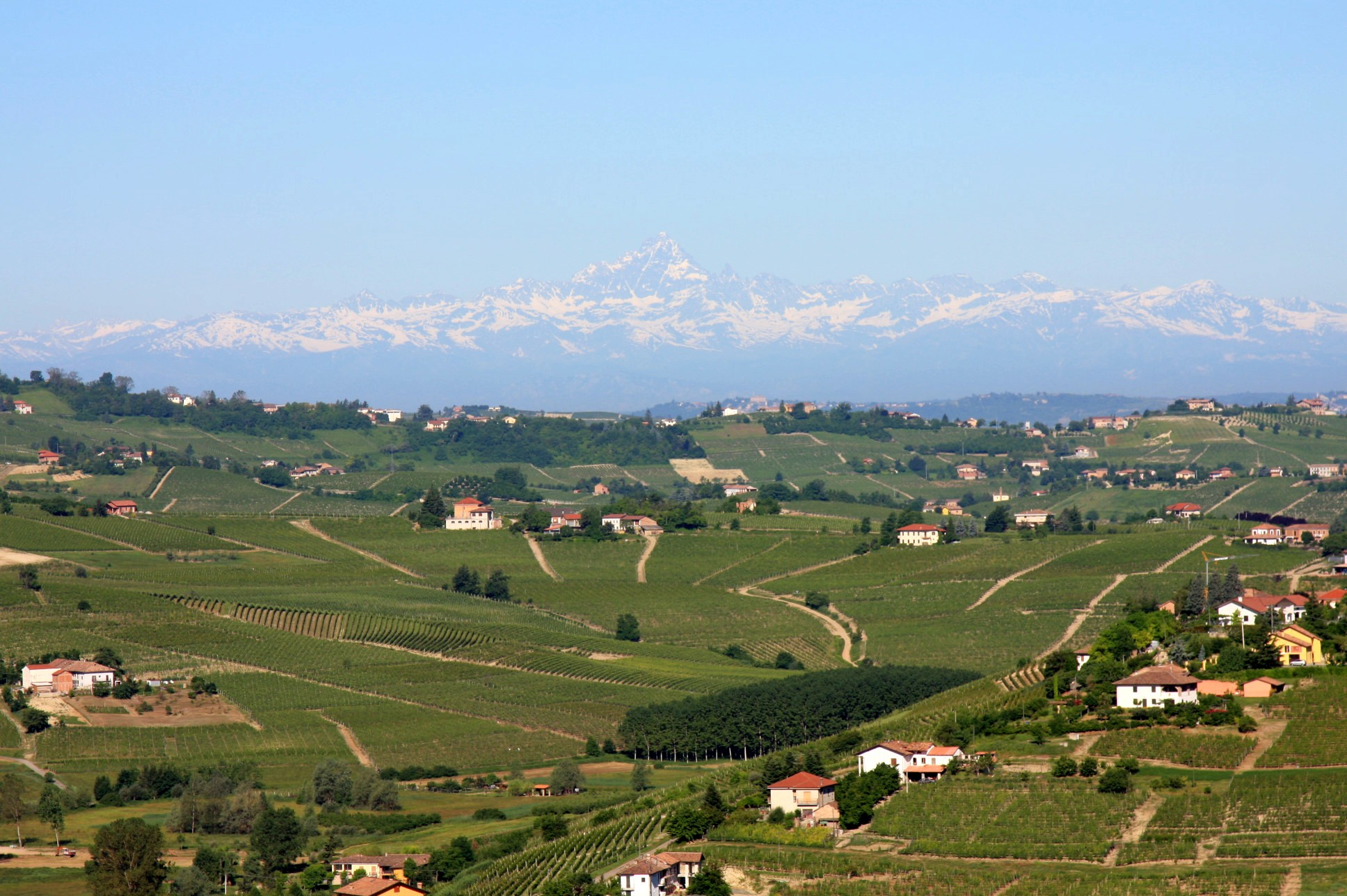
A landscape in Montferrat: view from San Marzano Oliveto, Astesan Montferrat, towards Monviso

20 million years ago the Alps were formed, in the Mediterranean area producing a new rising heat from the Earth's mantle which resulted in the buckle and rupture of the European crust which detached the Sardinian-Course block, the micro Sardinian plate did pin on the Ligurian Gulf executing a counterclockwise rotation of 50° and forming the Ligurian Sea. The sea covered the hill of Turin, the Langhe, Montferrat and the Po Valley. The rotation of the Corsica-Sardinia block opposed by the African block produced a pressure that gave rise to the Apennines. 8 million years ago to the east of the Corsica-Sardinia block opened a wide north–south divide that separated the Italian peninsula from Corsica and Sardinia, this gap widened to become the Tyrrhenian Sea. In the period from 7 to 5 million years ago, the Mediterranean Sea was closed and remained isolated from the Atlantic Ocean. This resulted in the increase of the temperature of the water that turned the Mediterranean into a low-salt lake with many areas dried up, this condition lasted for several hundreds of thousands of years was deposited sediment-type saline evaporites. Subsequently, the Mediterranean Sea was opened, and the ocean water began to circulate between the Alps and the Apennines had formed a triangular gulf that covered the entire Po Valley. Due to the continuous lifting of the Alps and the Apennines to the sea withdrew from this gulf and the accumulation of sediments carried by the rivers gave rise to a flood plain which corresponds to the Po Valley. The marine deposits of this period are visible in the area of Asti.

== Economy ==
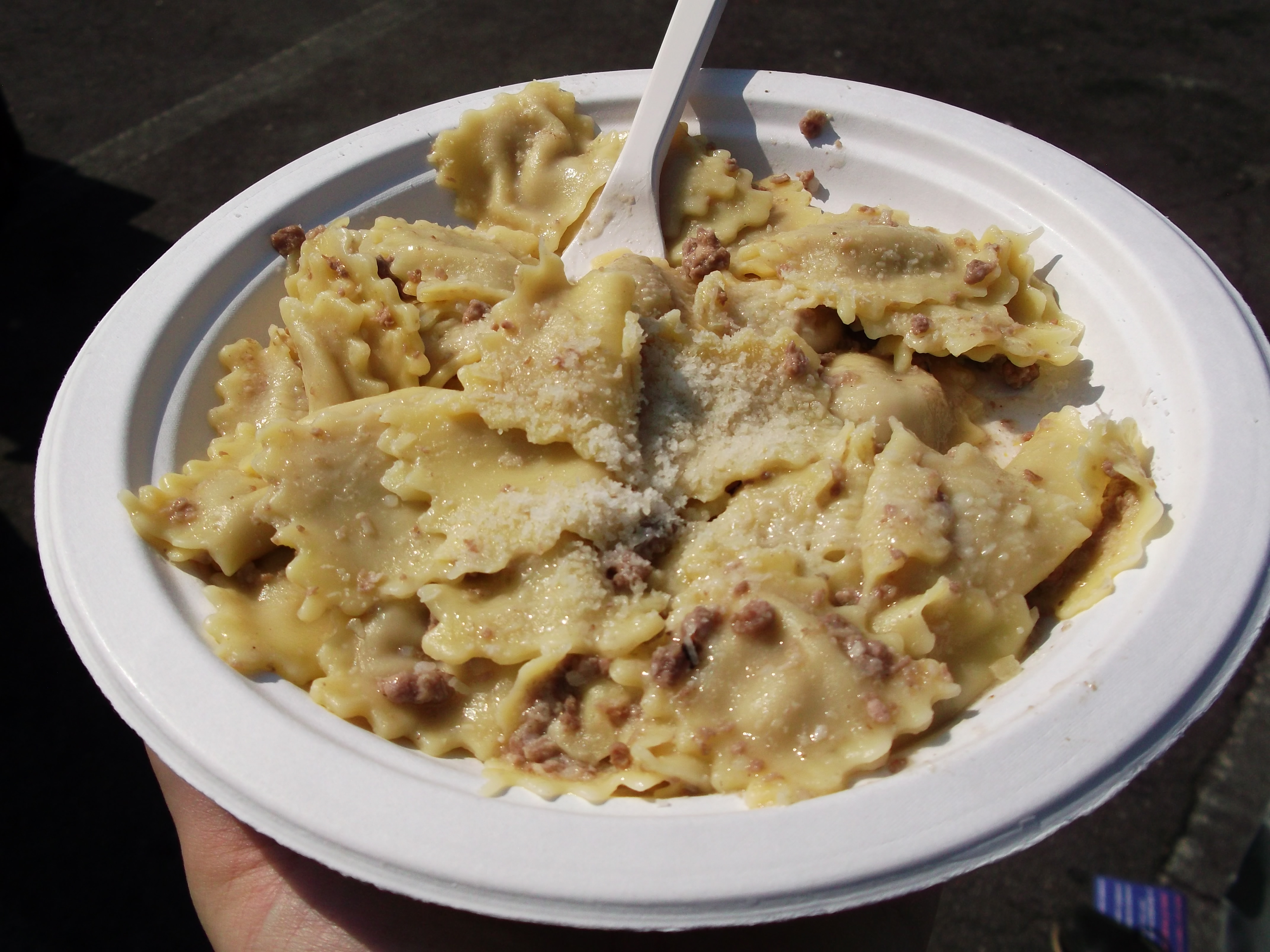
Agnolotti, one of Montferrat's typical dishes

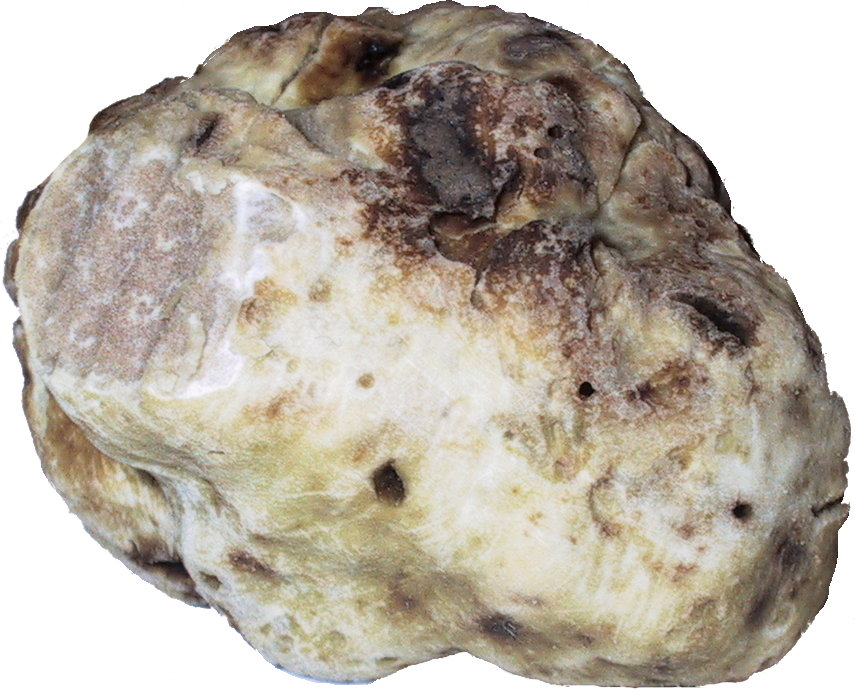
White truffle washed and corner cut to show the interior

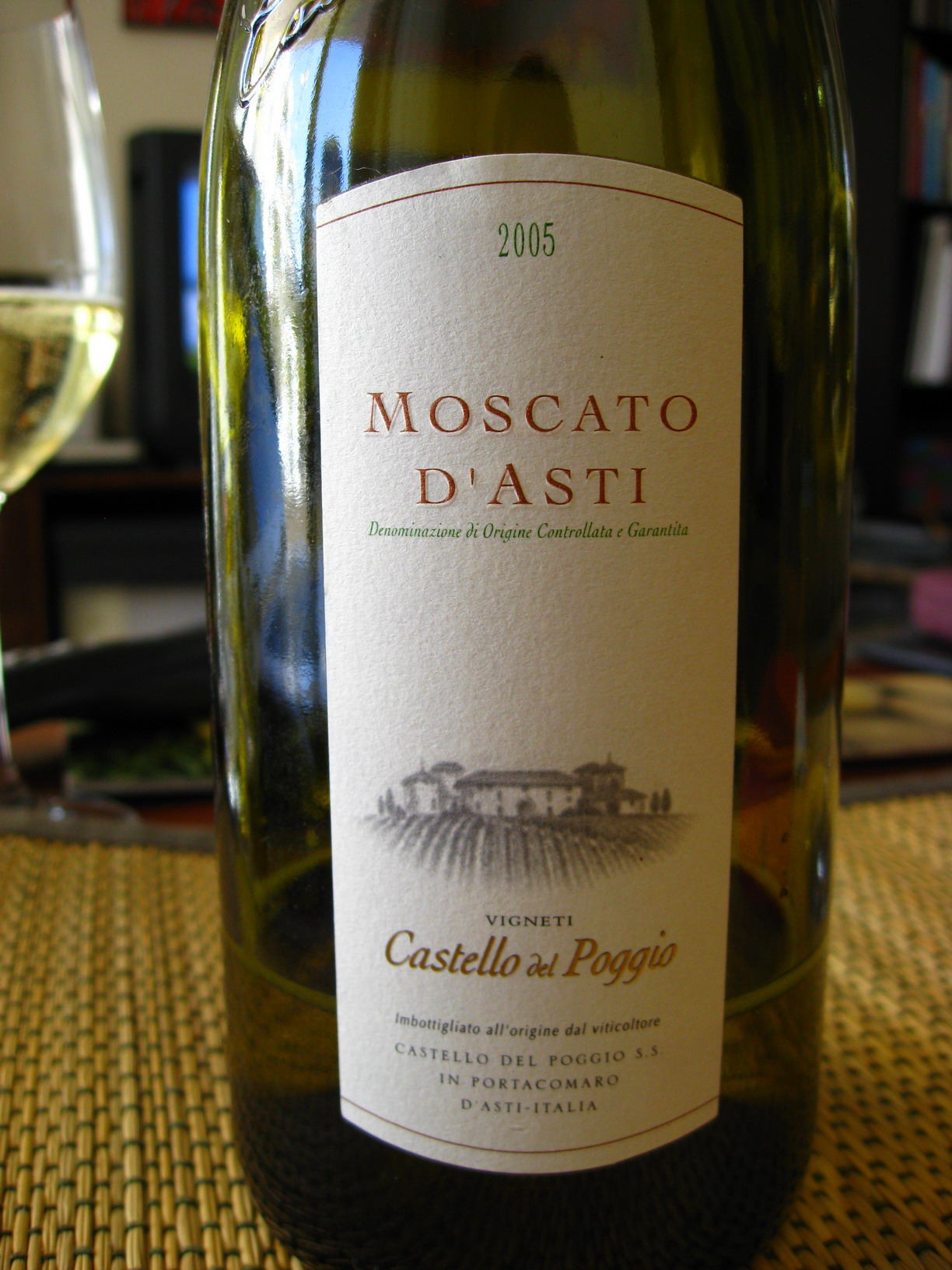
Moscato d'Asti

Monferrato is one of the most famous Italian wine regions in the world, especially regarding red wines and sparkling wines. The climate is dry continental with hot summers prone to drought and cold winters and the particular hydrogeological soil is favourable for viticulture, which, however, is dominant throughout, making the wine not only an element of economic wealth for the entire region but also a true symbol of the culture and tradition "Monferrina". The widespread dissemination of indigenous grapes and consequently a wide variety of wines witnesses them. Among the wines (DOC and DOCG), the most famous are Barbera d'Asti, Asti spumante, Moscato d'Asti, Cortese, Malvasia, and Grignolino.

The Monferrato, together with Alba, is also known for the production of truffles; there are many fairs in this trade, for example, the regional fair of truffles held in Montechiaro d'Asti.

== Viticulture ==
DOC and DOCG wines produced in this area include:

=== Reds ===
- Barbera d'Asti
- Barbera d'Asti Superiore
- Nizza DOCG (from Barbera grapes)
- Barbera del Monferrato
- Monferrato Rosso
- Ruché
- Albugnano (from Nebbiolo grapes)
- Dolcetto d’Asti
- Freisa d’Asti
- Grignolino
- Malvasia di Casorzo
- Malvasia di Castelnuovo Don Bosco
- Dolcetto di Ovada

=== Whites ===
- Moscato d'Asti
- Asti Spumante
- Cortese dell’Alto Monferrato (from Cortese grape)
- Loazzolo (wine)

== Culture ==
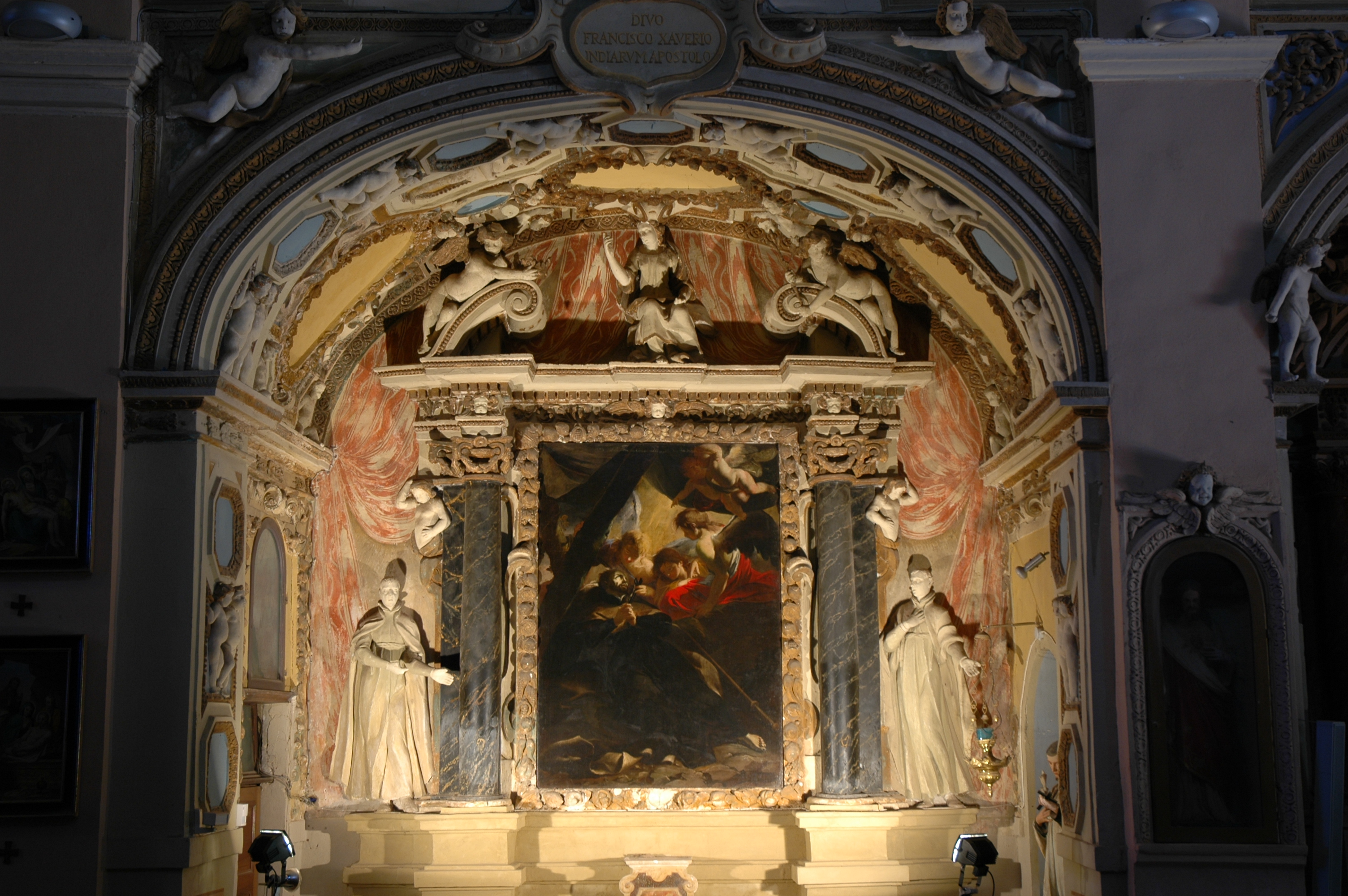
Altarpiece by Andrea Pozzo

=== Cuisine ===
The traditional cuisine of Montferrat, in addition to the award-winning wines, includes a wide variety of foods ranging from meat, fish, vegetables, and cheeses. Typical Monferrato dishes, which have now achieved a reputation not only nationally but also internationally include, among the first courses, agnolotti "al plin" (literally "pinched"), "Tajarin" (noodles for rich eggs seasoned with various sauces), risotto of Casale, rice with mushrooms and red wine, vegetable soups, polenta with fried cod or "loan". Worthy of mention and especially well-known is Bagna càuda. Among the meats are tripe, paws (batciuà), chickpeas with head, oxtail (now cooked with Barbera) and the cooked sausage.

=== Literature ===
In the second half of the 15th century stands in the field of dialect literature Gian Giorgio Alione of Asti, poet, playwright and writer who knew poetry in French and Italian, wrote several farces in dialect, expressing "an Astezan" and provided a vivid picture of customs and life of the period and the Italian theatre of the 16th century, often steeped in satire and mockery. It was not until the 18th century to find two other versifiers Monferrato dialect that is the prior Incisa and Captain Joseph Stefano della Rocca, while in more recent times and in the 19th century that stands out the most famous Angelo Brofferio, politician, journalist and deputy linked to the Risorgimento, who wrote songs in dialect, plays and works of history.

=== Art ===
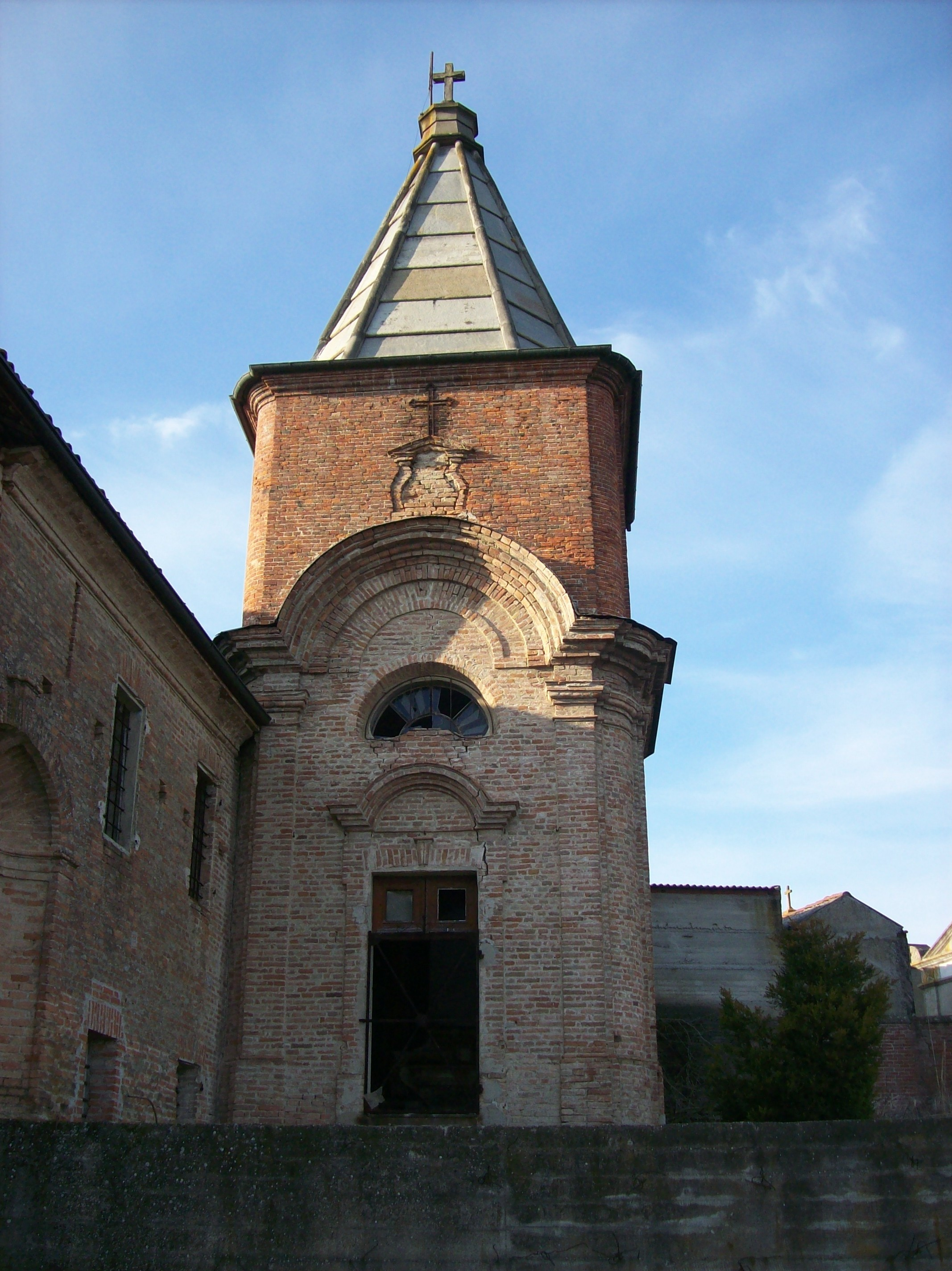
Chapel of Guazzolo (Castelletto Merli, Alessandria), an example of Piedmontese Baroque by Magnocavallo

Artists active in the Montferrat include Gian Martino Spanzotti of Casale and Andrea Pozzo, Renaissance painter and architect active in the 17th century, the painter Pier Francesco Guala; Macrino d'Alba, a contemporary of Spanzotti, whose works are in private and public collections in the United States and Turin. His most important works can, however, identify a triptych housed in the castle of Camino, a Madonna Enthroned kept in the Sanctuary of the Sacro Monte di Crea, another Madonna in the church of St. John the Baptist to Alba and a Marriage of St. Catherine that adorns the church of Neviglie in the Langhe. Guglielmo Caccia, nicknamed "The Moncalvo", executed works such as a "Redeemer" statue from the Museum of Asti and "Resurrection" in the cathedral; several of his paintings can be found in the parishes of Grazzano Badoglio, Villadeati, Casale Monferrato, San Salvatore Monferrato, Moncalvo and Castagnito.

=== Architecture ===
The architecture flourished in Montferrat from the year 1000 onwards and is clearly visible in the numerous buildings, churches, castles and palaces of various periods many of which are still well preserved. Architecture was influenced by current Romanesque, Gothic and Renaissance trends, before becoming, from the 17th century onwards, a current of Piedmontese Baroque. Architects who worked in Montferrat include Benedetto Alfieri (1707-1767) of Asti, considered the successor to Filippo Juvarra, and Francesco Gallo (1672-1750) of Mondovì, as well as Francesco Ottavio Magnocavalli, born in Casale Monferrato.

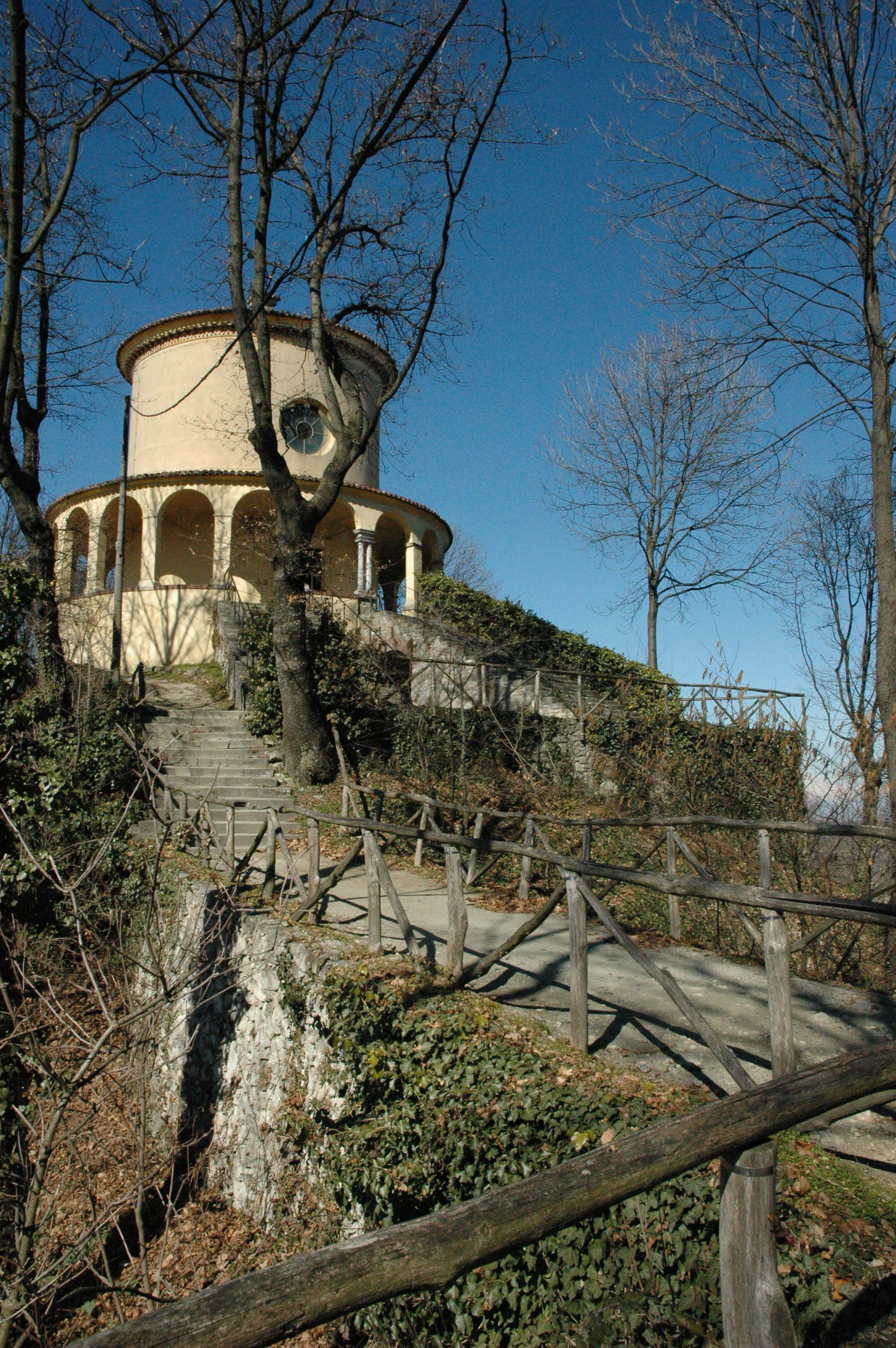
Paradise Chapel at the Sacro Monte di Crea

==== Sacred Mount of Crea ====
The Sacred Mountain of Crea (Italian: Sacro Monte di Crea) is a Roman Catholic sanctuary in the comune of Serralunga di Crea (Montferrat), near Alessandria. It is one of the nine Sacri Monti of Piedmont and Lombardy, included in UNESCO World Heritage list.

Its construction was begun in 1589, around a former Sanctuary of St. Mary whose creation is traditionally attributed to St. Eusebius, who first Christianized the site around 350 AD.

== See also ==
- Rulers of Montferrat, for a full list of marquesses and dukes
- March of Montferrat
- Duchy of Montferrat
- Iudiciaria Torrensis
- Giovanna of Montferrat

== Sources ==
- Official web site for European Sacred Mounts
- Money in the Montferrat from Medieval to Modern Times
