= Aleramo of Montferrat =

Aleramo

Marquis of Montferrat
- Reign: 967–991
- Predecessor: William I
- Successor: William II; Otto I
- Born: 904; Sezzadio, Province of Alessandria, Piedmont, Northwest Italy
- Died: 991; Grazzano Badoglio, Province of Asti, Piedmont, Northwest Italy
- Burial: Abbazia Aleramica, Grazzano Badoglio, Province of Asti, Piedmont, Northwest Italy
- Spouse: Adelaide
- Issue: William II, Marquis of Montferrat; Otto I, Marquis of Montferrat; Anselm Ι
- House: House of Aleramici
- Father: William I

Aleram (Italian: Aleramo; died 991) was the first marquis of Montferrat and Liguria (the marca Aleramica) in Northern Italy until his death. He was son of William I of Montferrat and is mentioned in documents for the first time in 933 when he received a fief near Vercelli by King Hugh of Italy. In 955 he was invested of lands in what is now the province of Alessandria.

== Life ==
In 958 he was appointed as Marquis by Berengar II of Italy, whose daughter Gerberga he had married. Three years later, however, Aleram sided for emperor Otto I, who gave him further lands in the Langhe and from the Tanaro, the Orba and the Ligurian Sea. The new grants had been favoured by Adelaide of Burgundy, wife of Otto I from 951 and previous wife of Lothair II, and also daughter of Rudolph II of Burgundy.

When Italy came under the direct control of the Holy Roman Empire in 962, Aleramo's titles were confirmed by the Emperor Otto I.

== Family ==
Aleramo had three sons from his first wife, Adelasia:

- William II, died before 967, co-ruler with his father
- Otto, died 991. His son William III succeeded to Montferrat
- Anselm Ι, who succeeded to Liguria. He was the founder of the House of Del Vasto and fathered Anselm II of Liguria. Also ancestor of the Del Carretto dynasty.

He was buried in Grazzano Badoglio, in the Province of Asti. His tomb, restored in the 16th and 20th centuries, is marked by a mosaic depicting mythological beasts.

== See also ==
- Monte Pietra Ardena

== Sources ==
- Circolo Culturale I Marchesi del Monferrato (external link to website devoted to dynastic history)

Preceded by William I	Marquis of Montferrat; 967–991	Succeeded by Otto I
Preceded by –	Marquis of Liguria ?–967	Succeeded by Anselmo
