= Sacred Mount Calvary of Domodossola =

Church in Domodossola, Italy

Coordinates: 46°06′20″N 8°17′13″E

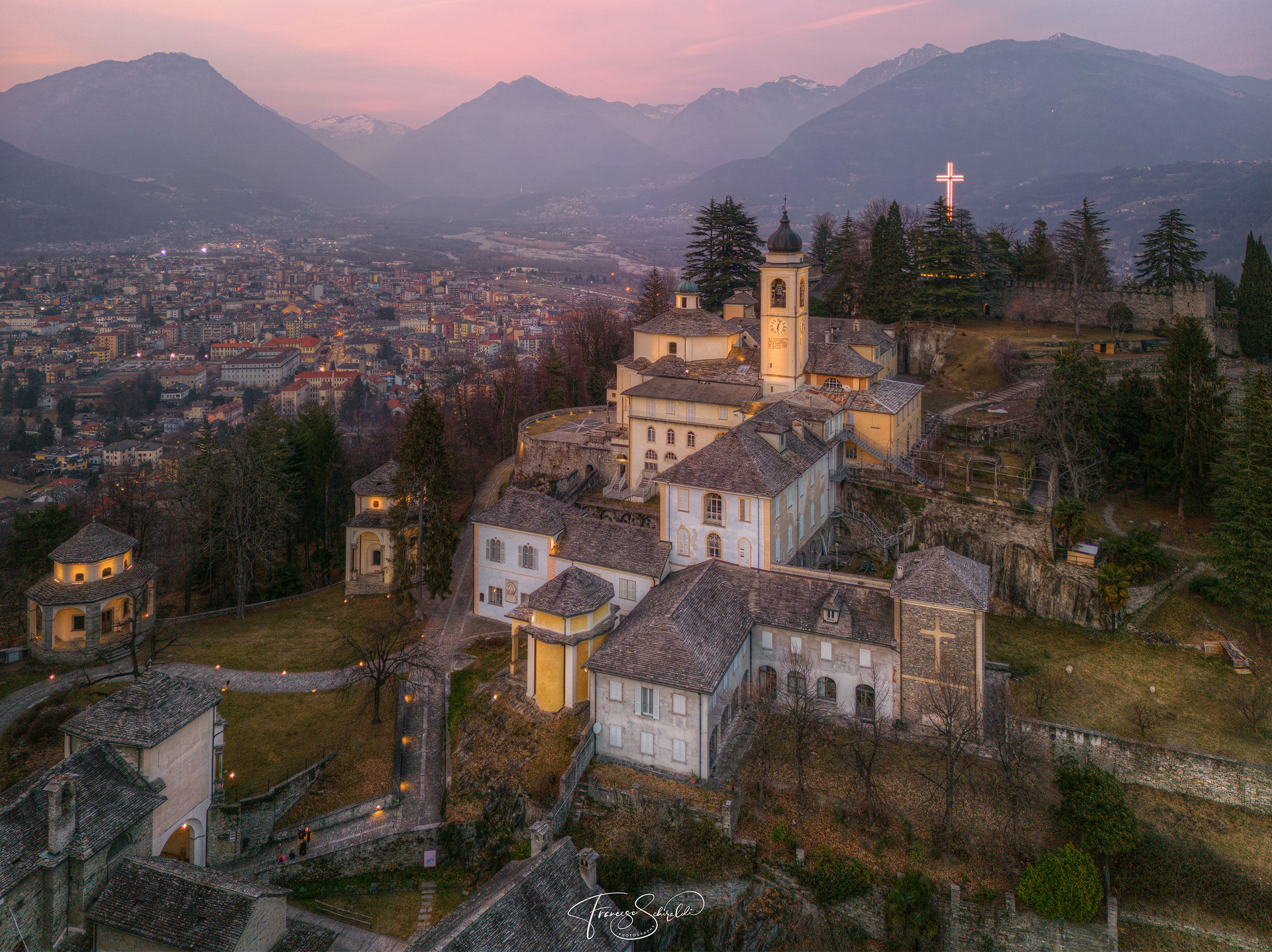
View of the complex

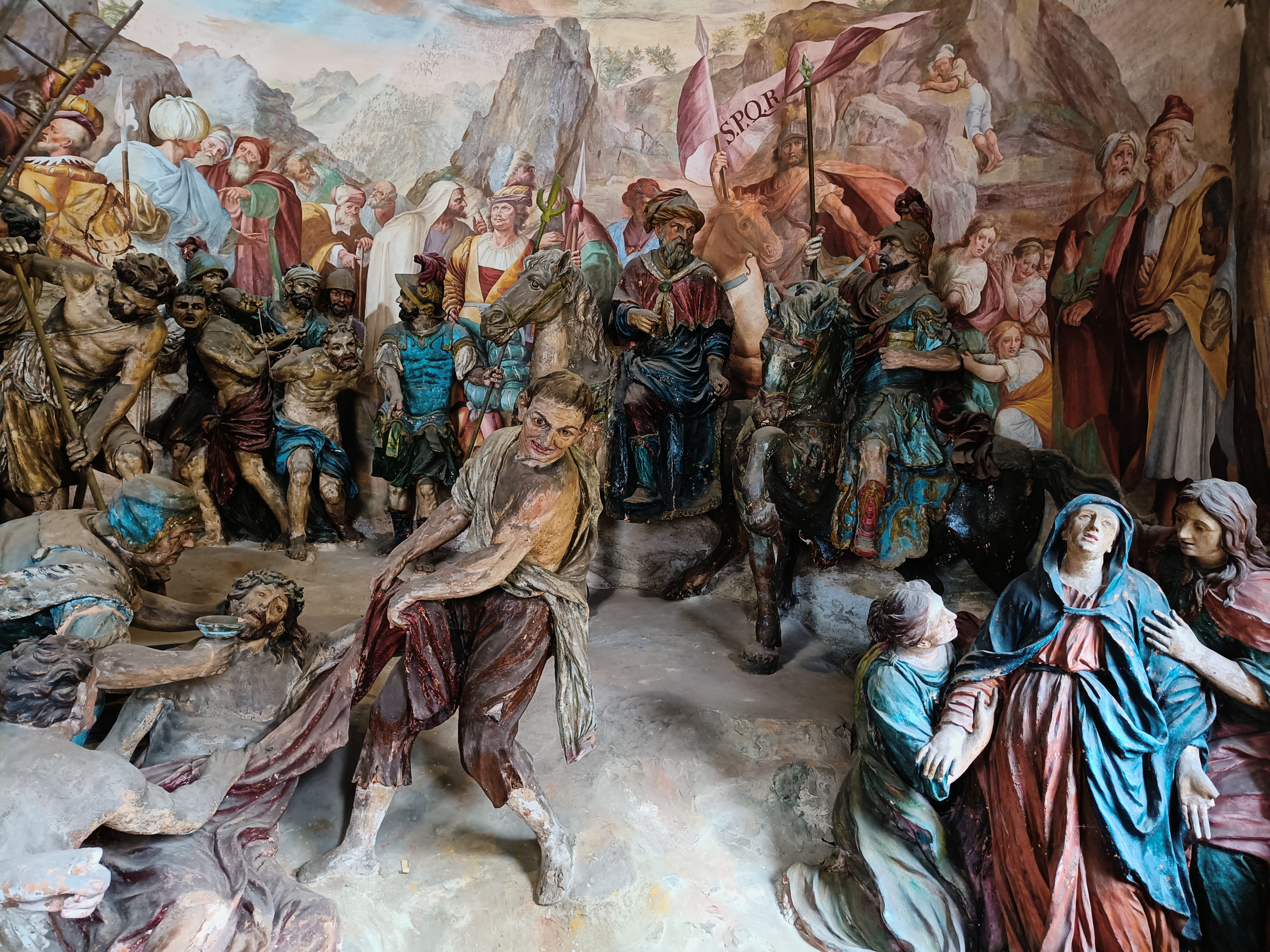
Interior of chapel X, Statues of Giuseppe Rusnati (1710)

The Sacred Mount Calvary of Domodossola (also known as Sacro Monte Calvario) is a Roman Catholic sanctuary on the Mattarella Hill, overlooking Domodossola (Piedmont, northern Italy). It is one of the nine Sacri Monti of Piedmont and Lombardy, included in the UNESCO World Heritage list.

It was built in 1657 in response to the wishes of the Capuchin friars, Gioacchino da Cassano and Andrea da Rho. The chapels, dedicated to the Via Crucis, are positioned along a devotional route which starts on the outskirts of Domodossola and ends at the summit of Mount Mattarella. The sanctuary on the summit was consecrated in 1690 and in 1828 the philosopher priest, Antonio Rosmini, founded the Institute of Charity. Over the centuries the Sacred Mountain has undergone various modifications, rebuilding and restoration including, in 1957, the wooden statues in chapels 3, 5, 6 and 7.

It is a stop-over on the CoEur devotional path.
