= Otto II of Montferrat =

Marquis of Montferrat

Otto II, Marquis of Montferrat

Marquis of Montferrat
- Reign: 1042 – 20 November 1084
- Predecessor: William III
- Successor: William IV
- Born: c. 1015
- Died: 20 November 1084 (aged 68–69)
- Spouse: Constance of Savoy
- Issue: William IV; Henry
- House: Aleramici
- Father: William III
- Mother: Waza

Otto II (also Otho, Ottone, or Oddone) (c. 1015 – 20 November 1084) was the fourth Marquis of Montferrat from 1042 until his death. He was a member of the Aleramid dynasty.

== Life ==
Otto was the son and successor of William III and Waza. After his father's death in 1042, Otto ruled the March of Montferrat alongside his younger brother, Henry of Montferrat until Henry's death, c.1045. Thereafter, Otto ruled alone until his own death in 1084.

He married Constance of Savoy, daughter of Amadeus II of Savoy. He was succeeded by their son William IV. His second son Henry was the founder of the dynasty of the Marquiss of Occimiano.

== Sources ==
- Schwennicke, Detlev. Europäische Stammtafeln: Stammtafeln zur Geschichte der Europäischen Staaten. Marburg: Verlag von J. A. Stargardt, 1978. (in German)

Preceded by William III	Marquis of Montferrat; 1042–1084	Succeeded by William IV
