= Iudiciaria Torrensis =

Carolingian district of northwest Italy

The iudiciaria Torrensis, also known as fines Torrenses, comitatus Toresianus or Torresana, was a Carolingian district of north-west Italy which is referred to in charters from the second half of the 9th century and from the early years of the century following. Lying to the north of the County of Asti and to the south of the river Po, it extended from the eastern spurs of the Hills of Turin to the confluence of the Po and the Tanaro near Bassignana. Thus it corresponded broadly with the territory of today's Basso Monferrato. Each form of its name derives from the Castrum Turris which stood on the hill now known as San Lorenzo, (from the pieve dedicated to Saint Laurence). The district appears to have lost its status in the mid to late tenth century and its territory to have been divided between the counties of Turin, Asti and Vercelli and subsequently between the Aleramici, the Bishops of Asti, and the Bishops of Vercelli.
