= William I of Montferrat =

Father of the first Marquis Aleram

William I

Marquis of Montferrat
- Reign: 924–933
- Predecessor: None
- Successor: Alermo
- Born: 9th Century; Piedmont, Northwest Italy
- Died: 933
- Spouse: Unknown
- Issue: Aleramo, Marquis of Montferrat
- House: House of Aleramici

William I, Marquis of Montferrat (Italian: Guglielmo I del Monferrato, floruit 921, d. 933 or before) stands at the head of the Aleramici family which ruled Montferrat for four centuries. He was the father of the first Marquis Aleram.

== Life ==
According to the Gesta Berengarii Imperatoris, William was a Frank who crossed the Alps leading 300 armed retainers in 888–889 to fight alongside Guy III of Spoleto against Berengar of Friuli for the Iron Crown of Lombardy. He apparently established himself in northwestern Italy, probably supported by Guy, where he eventually received the title of comes. It is also probable that he gave his support to Berengar after Guy's death, for he appears, in 921, along with Lambert, Archbishop of Milan, and two other counts, Giselbert and Samson, as dilectissimi fideles of the Emperor. The counts were also cited as illustres comites. They stood opposed to Adalbert of Ivrea and others in rebellion against Berengar.

William transferred his allegiance again following the death of Berengar. He appears for the last time alive in 924, intervening on behalf of the bishop of Piacenza with Rudolf II of Burgundy, a claimant for the Italian crown. Never again does he appear in history and a diploma of his son's dating to around 933 fixes his death sometime between those two years (924–933). Nonetheless, some, including 18th-century historian Malaspina and 20th-century historians Usseglio and Cognasso (writing in 1960), consider him to have been alive in 961, based on a faulty reading and interpretation of the foundation charter of the monastery of Grazzano, founded that year by Aleram and his family.

Various legendary assertions about his Saxon and Kentish origins and the origins of his wife have been met by the definitive Dizionario Biografico with the pronouncement: Ma tali asserzioni non sono ancora state seriamente coinprovate da documenti: "But such assertions are not yet seriously backed up by the documents."

Preceded by -	Marquis of Montferrat; 924?–933?	Succeeded by Aleramo of Montferrat
Preceded by –	Marquis of Liguria; 924?–933?	Succeeded by Aleramo of Montferrat

== Sources ==
- Caravale, Mario, ed. (2003), "Guglielmo I", Dizionario Biografico degli Italiani, vol. 60 Grosso – Guglielmo da Forlì, Rome: Instituto della Enciclopedia italiana.
