= Sacro Monte di Crea =

Christian devotional complex in Serralunga di Crea, Piedmont, Italy

Coordinates: 45°05′41″N 8°16′11″E

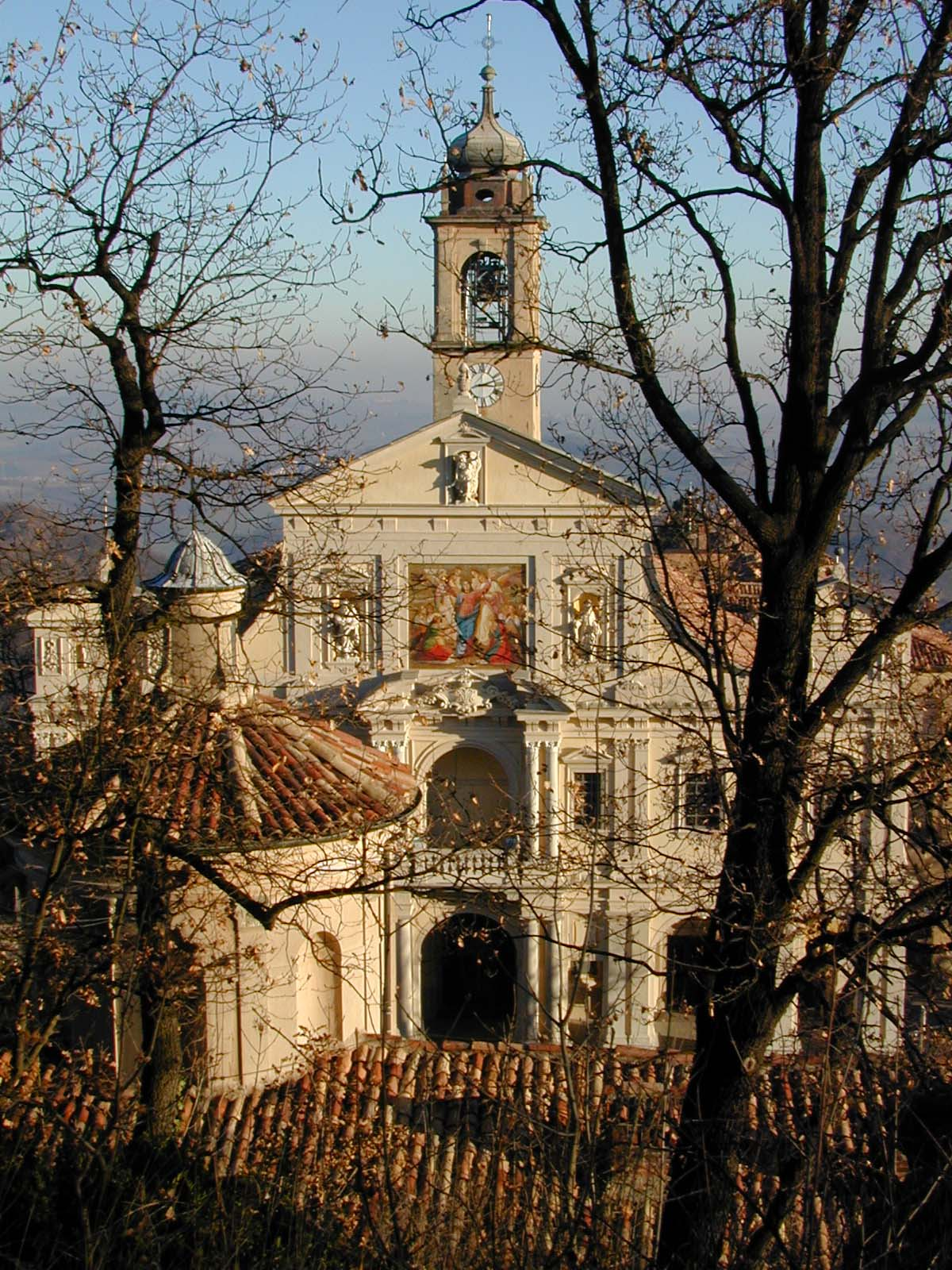
Façade of the sanctuary.

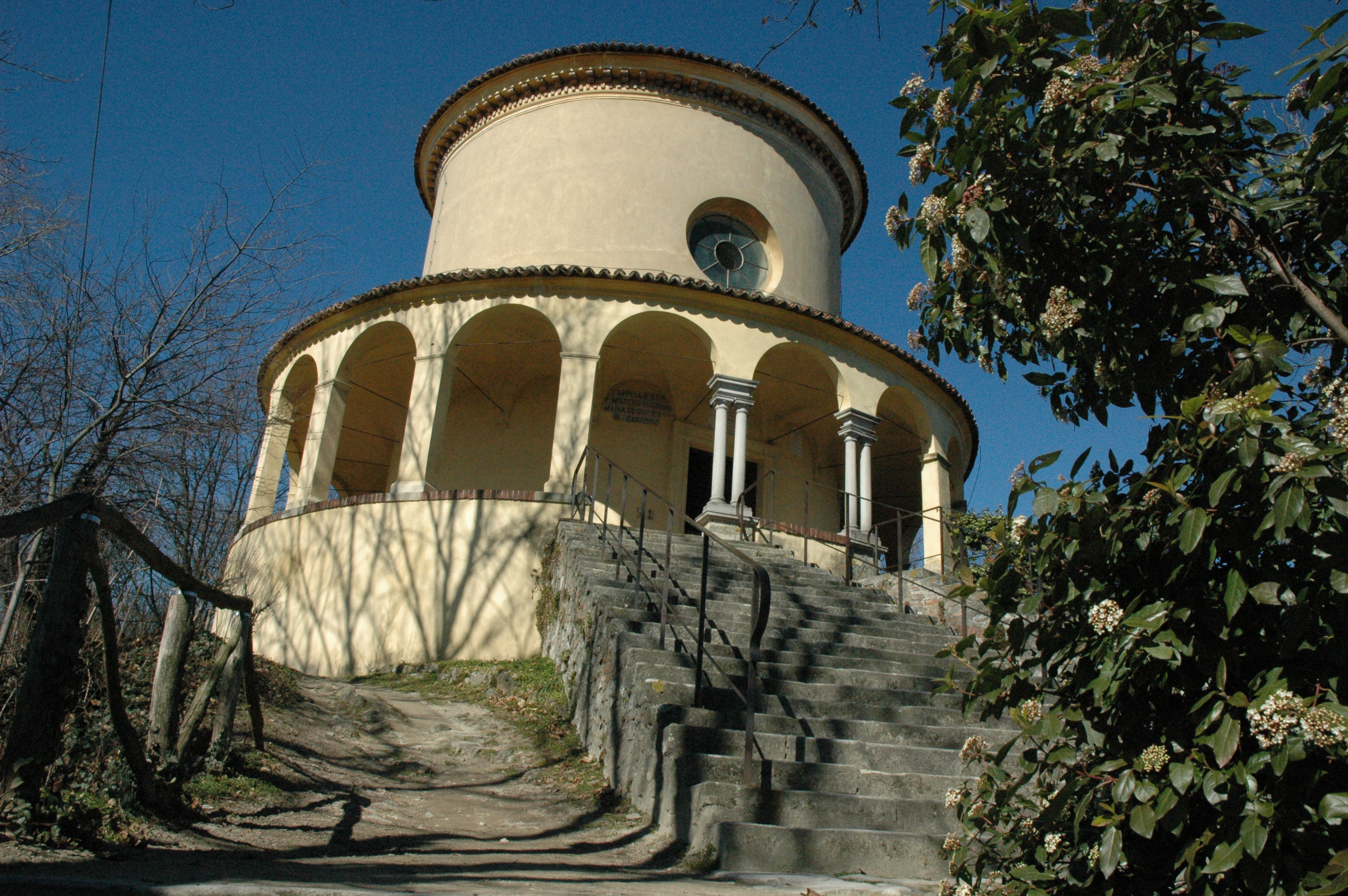
View of the "Paradise Chapel".

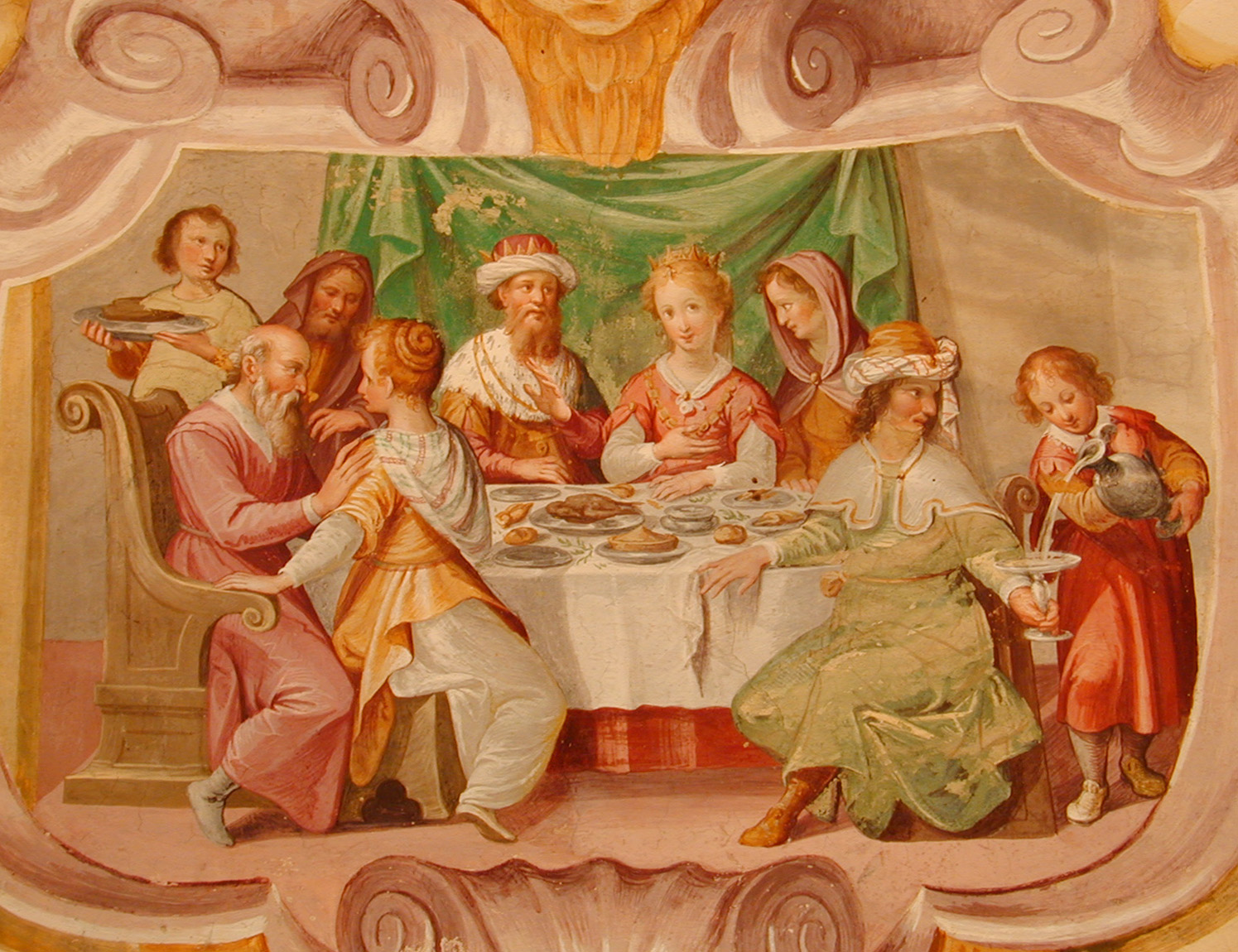
Fresco on the ceiling of chapel XVII, scene of a banquet told by the Old Testament, by Guglielmo Caccia, called "il Moncalvo".

The Sacro Monte di Crea (literally "Sacred Mountain of Crea", although it is built on a hill rather than a mountain) is a Roman Catholic sanctuary in the comune of Serralunga di Crea, Piedmont, northern Italy. It is reached via a steeply ascending route which winds through a wooded natural park, whose flora was catalogued by the Casalese photographer and polymath Francesco Negri. It is one of the nine Sacri Monti of Piedmont and Lombardy, included in the UNESCO World Heritage list.

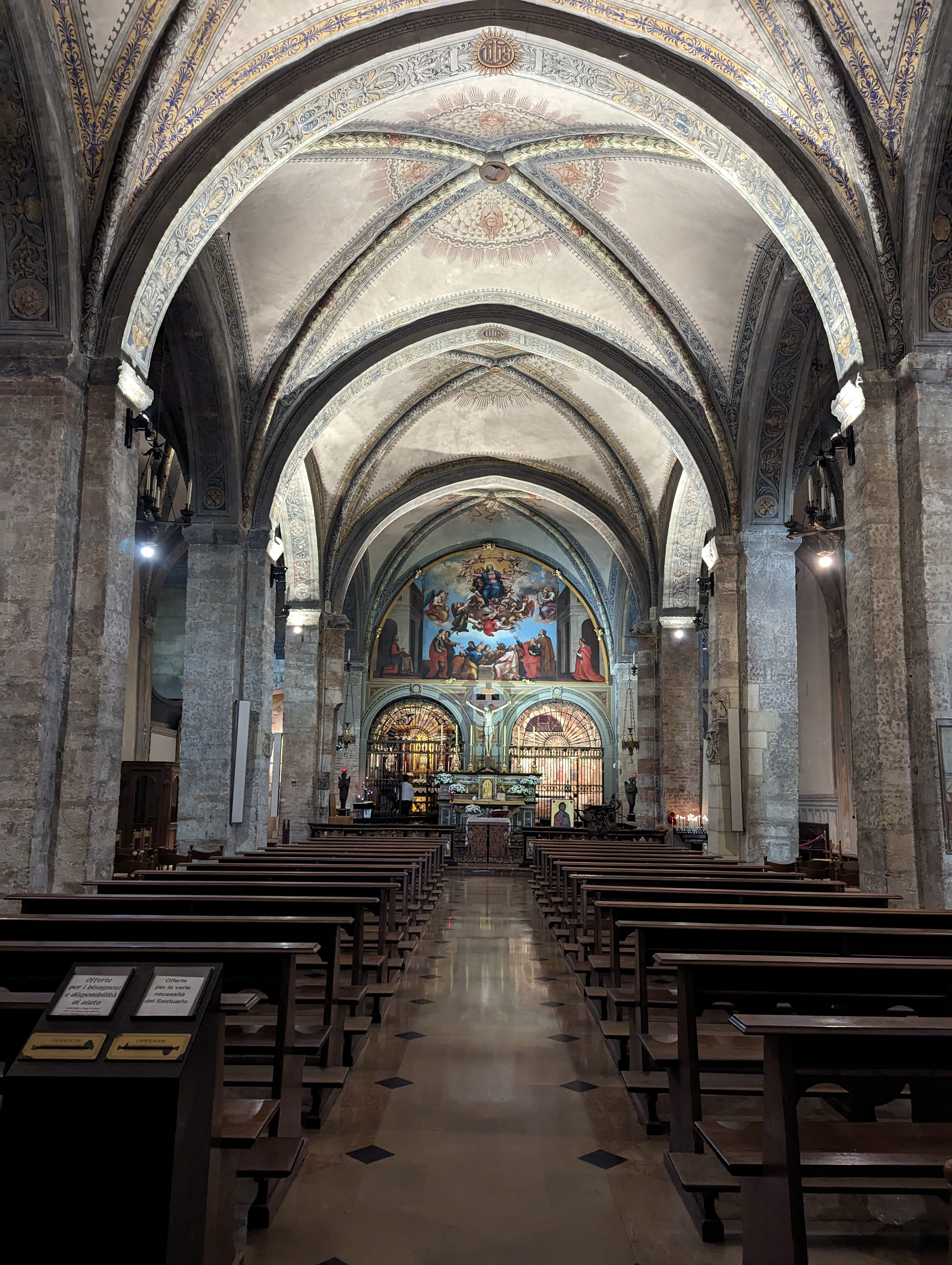
Sacro Monte di Crea - chapel interior

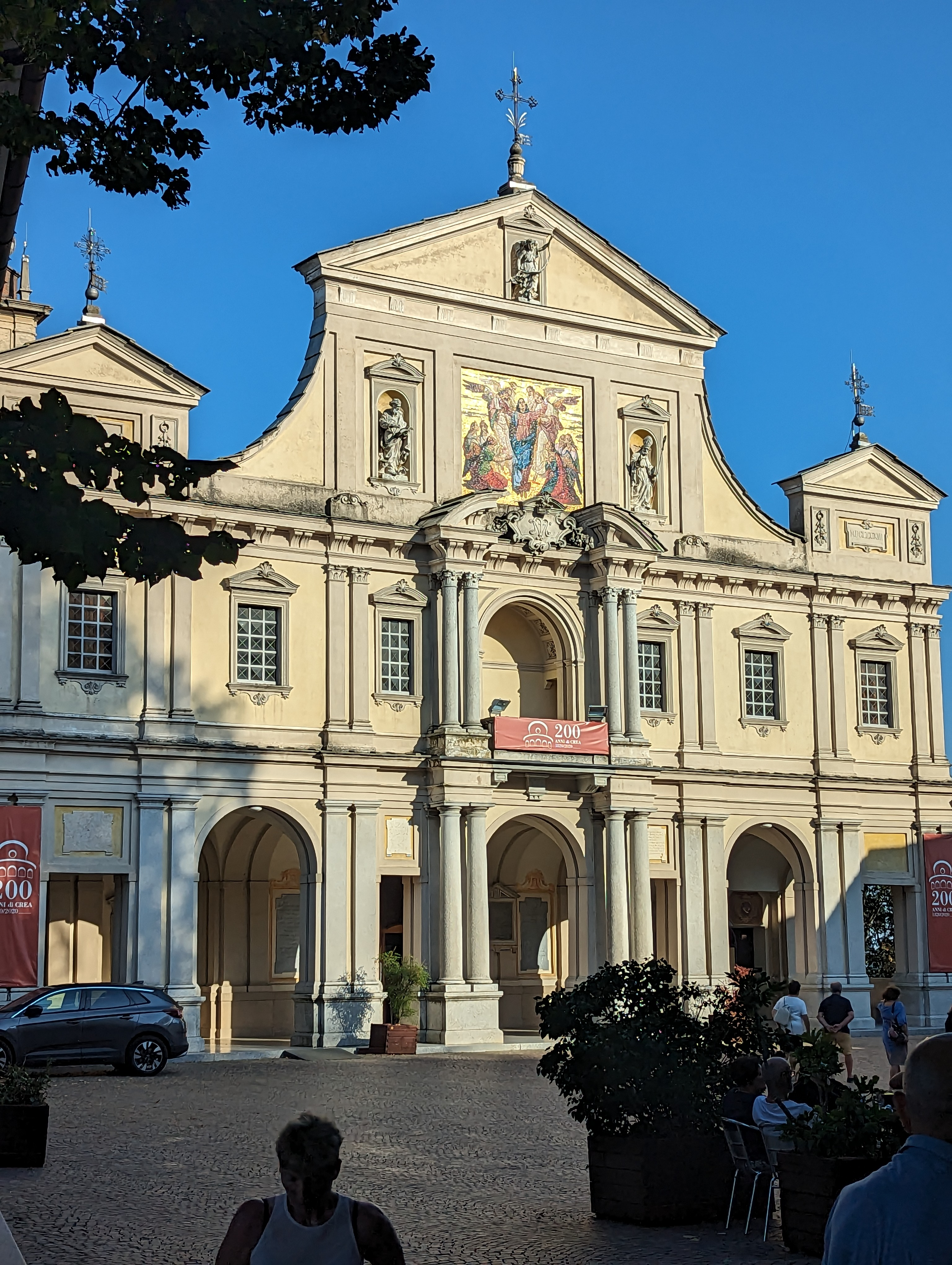
Sacro Monte di Crea - façade

== History ==
Construction began in 1589 around an existing sanctuary which is dedicated to the Virgin Mary and whose creation is traditionally attributed to Saint Eusebius of Vercelli around 350 AD. Eusebius is also said to have installed the statue of the Madonna which is still venerated in the sanctuary.

The chapels dedicated to the Mysteries of the Rosary were positioned around the one-thousand-year-old Marian sanctuary on the highest of the hills of Basso Monferrato. As time passed the initial scheme of the monumental layout was altered on a number of occasions and in 1820 significant restoration work began after its partial destruction.

== The park ==
Since 1980, woods and some agricultural land surrounding the Sacro Monte have been preserved as the Parco naturale del Sacro Monte di Crea, whose area is 34 hectares (84.0 acres) where visitors can admire some plant species no longer widely found elsewhere.
