= Sacri Monti of Piedmont and Lombardy =

Christian devotional places in northern Italy

UNESCO World Heritage Site
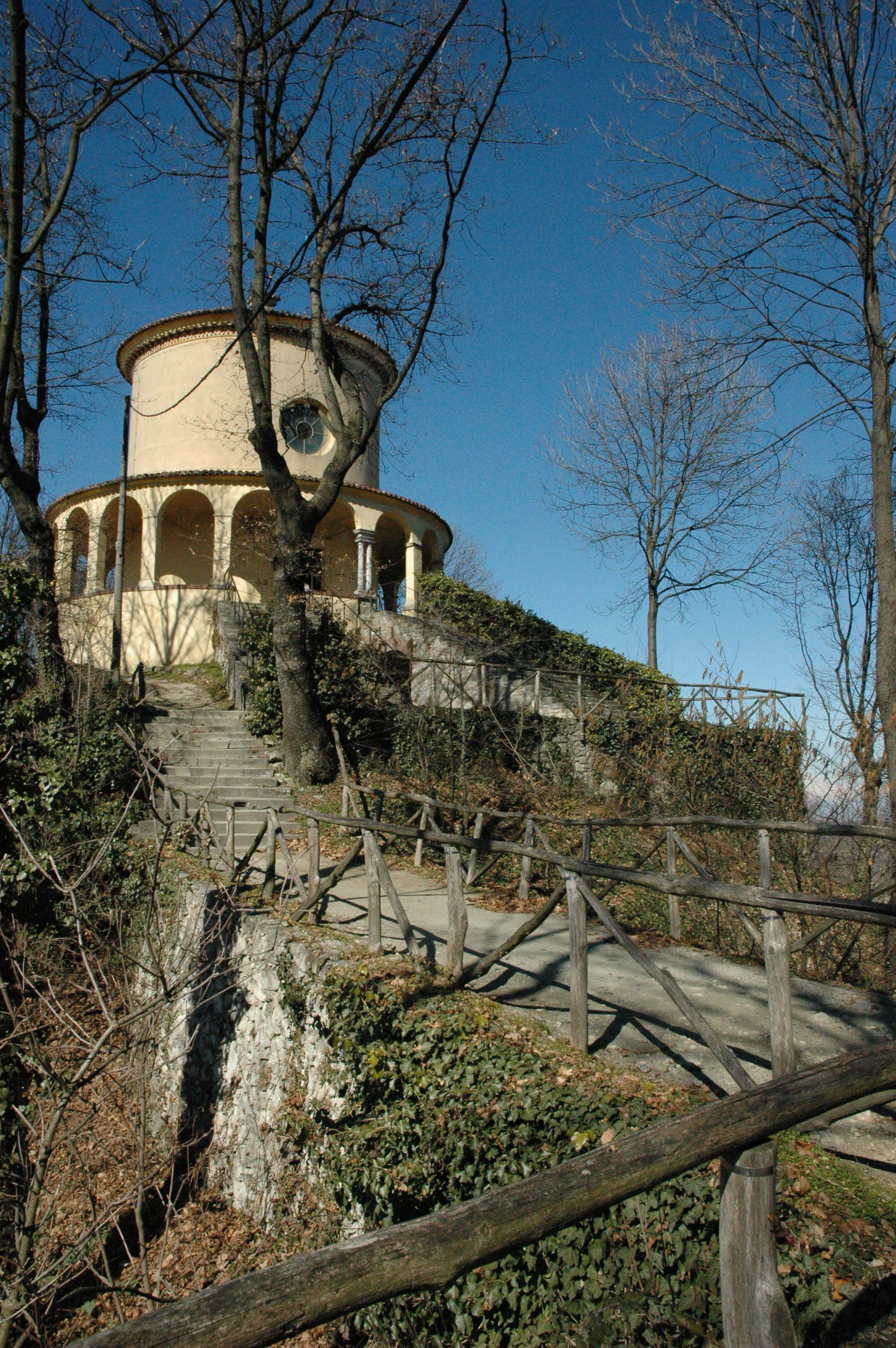
- Paradise Chapel of the Sacro Monte di Crea

- Location within Piedmont Location within Lombardy Location within Italy
- Location: Piedmont and Lombardy in Italy
- Includes: nine calvaries or similar devotional ensembles
- Criteria: Cultural: (ii), (iv)
- Reference: 1068rev
- Inscription: 2003 (27th Session)
- Area: 90.5 ha (224 acres)
- Buffer zone: 721.9 ha (1,784 acres)
- Website: www.sacri-monti.com
- Coordinates: 45°58′28.4″N 9°10′10.4″E

The Sacri Monti (plural of Sacro Monte, Italian for "Sacred Mountain") of Piedmont and Lombardy are a series of nine calvaries or groups of chapels and other architectural features created in northern Italy during the late sixteenth century and the seventeenth century. They are dedicated to various aspects of the Christian faith and are considered of great beauty by virtue of the skill with which they have been integrated into the surrounding natural landscape of hills, forests and lakes. They also house important artistic materials in the form of wall paintings and statuary. In 2003, they were named as World Heritage Sites.

== Model and characteristics ==
The model of the calvary or "holy mountain" is a Christian creation dating from the late fifteenth century, that during the Counter-Reformation spread from Italy to Europe and the New World. A calvary is a devotional complex standing on the slopes of a mountain, with a series of chapels or kiosks containing scenes from the life of Christ, the Virgin Mary or the Saints, in the form of painting or sculptures.

As a re-evocation of the New Jerusalem, Sacred Mountains offered pilgrims an opportunity to visit the Holy Places by conjuring up, on a smaller scale, the buildings in which Christ's Passion took place. The Sacred Mountains stand on high ground, at some distance from the town centre, in a more natural setting. They are usually reached by pilgrimage. The itinerary leading up to the Sacred Mountain often re-evokes the Via Dolorosa, the road leading from Jerusalem to Calvary along which Christ carried the Cross.

== The nine ==
The nine Sacri Monti included in the World Heritage Site are:

1. The Sacro Monte of Nuova Gerusalemme (New Jerusalem) of Varallo Sesia (1486), Varallo Sesia, province of Vercelli
2. The Sacro Monte of Santa Maria Assunta, Serralunga di Crea (1589), province of Alessandria
3. The Sacro Monte of San Francesco, Orta San Giulio (1590), province of Novara
4. The Sacro Monte of the Rosary, Varese (1598)
5. The Sacro Monte of the Blessed Virgin, Oropa (1617), province of Biella
6. The Sacro Monte of the Blessed Virgin of Succour, Ossuccio (1635), province of Como
7. The Sacro Monte of the Holy Trinity, Ghiffa (1591), province of Verbano-Cusio-Ossola
8. The Sacro Monte and Calvary, Domodossola (1657), province of Verbano-Cusio-Ossola
9. The Sacro Monte of Belmonte, Valperga (1712), Metropolitan City of Turin
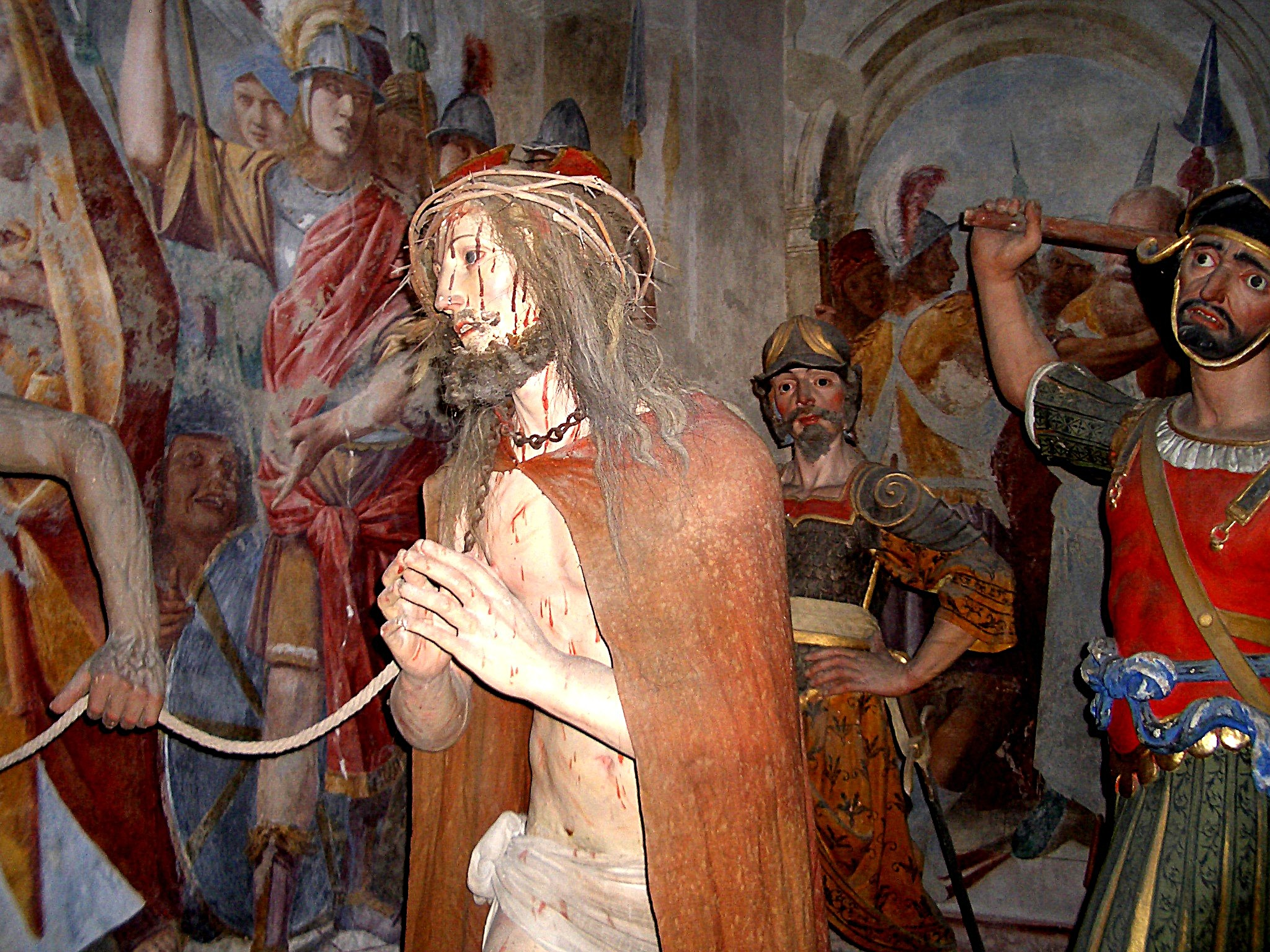
Sacro Monte di Varallo. Gaudenzio Ferrari, Statue of Christ on the Road to Calvary, Polychrome wood, ca. 1510

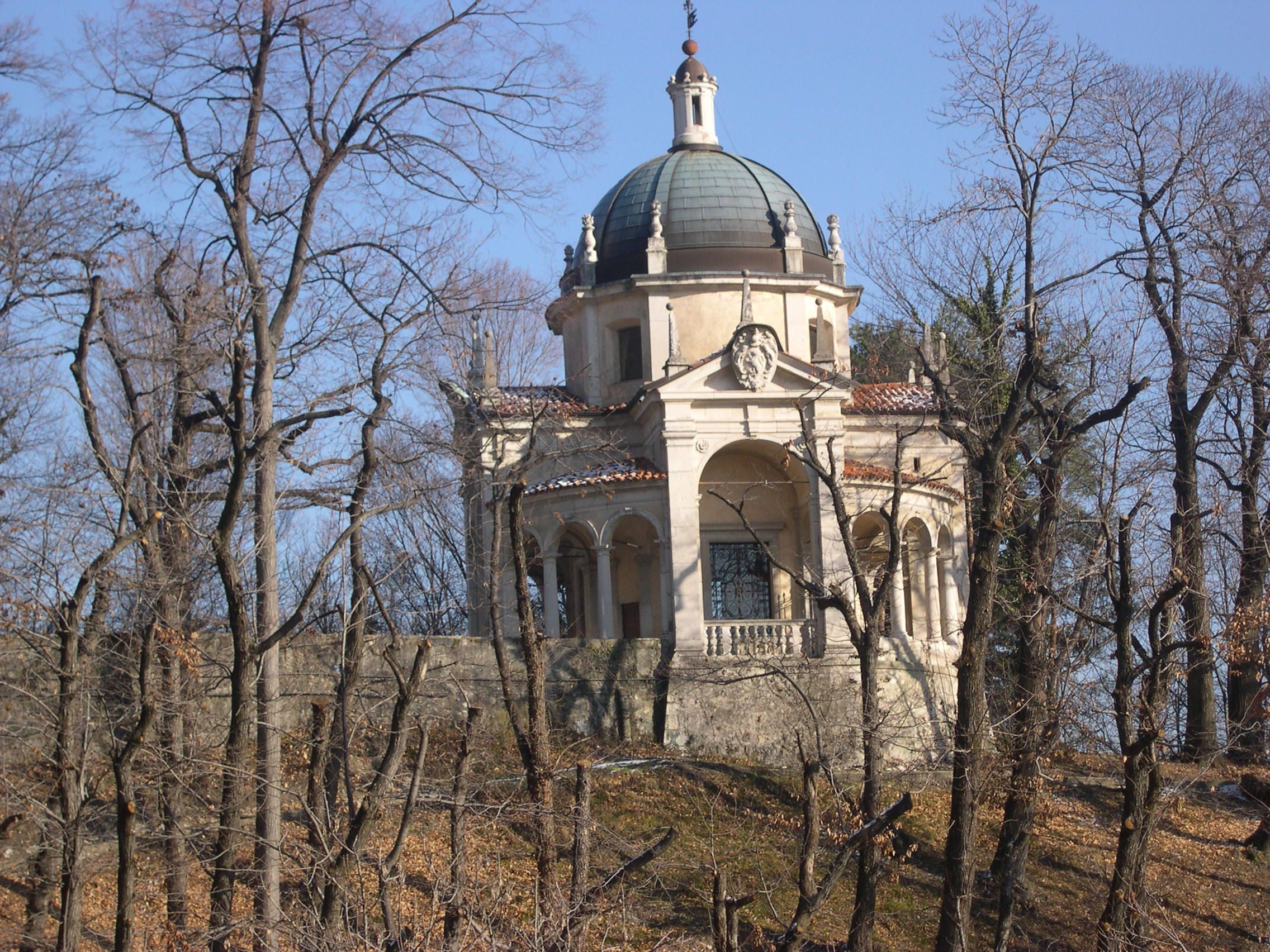
Chapel IV of the Sacro Monte (Varese)

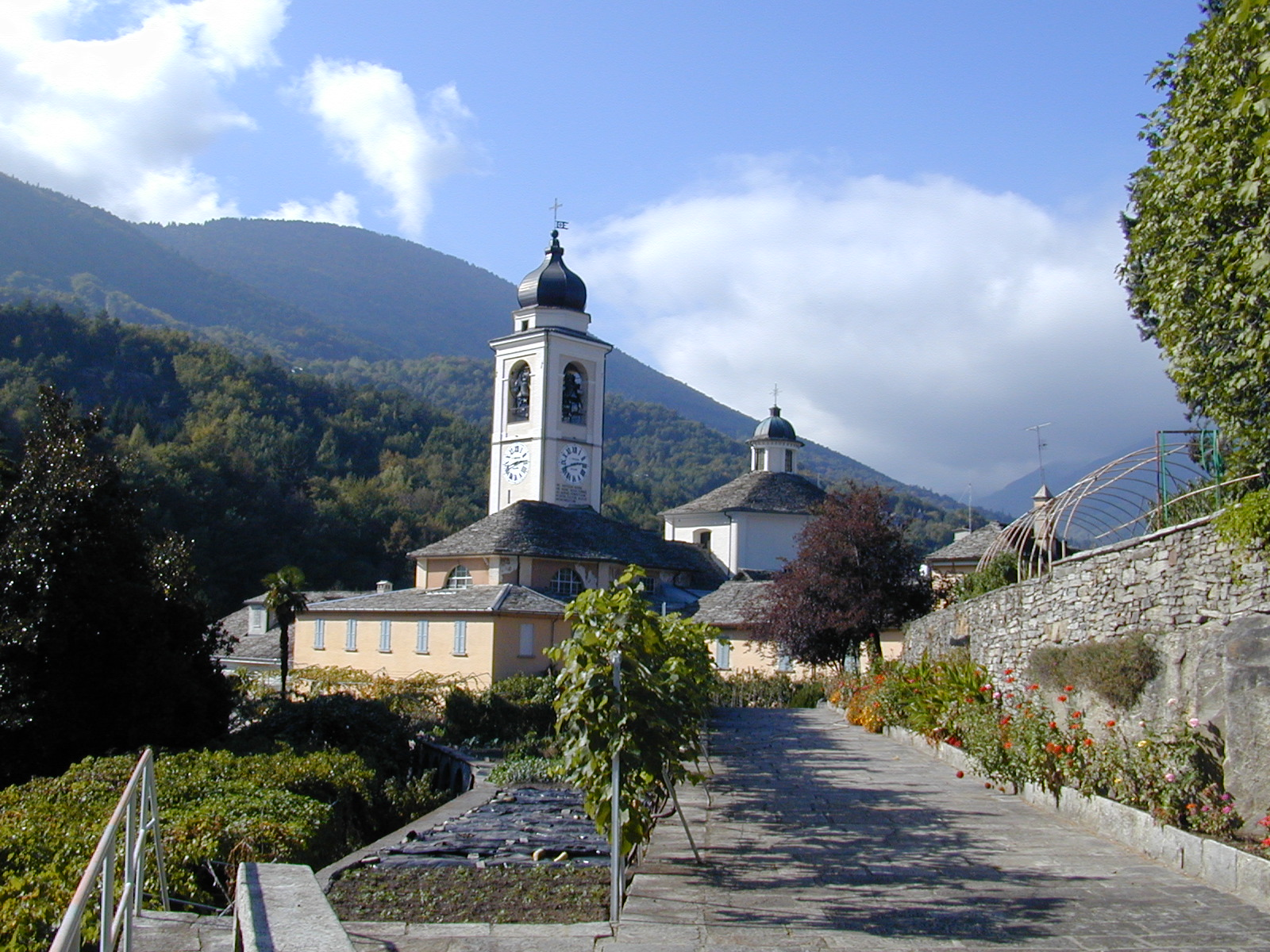
Sacro Monte di Domodossola

== See also ==
- Life of Jesus in the New Testament
