= William IV of Montferrat =

Marquis of Montferrat

William IV, Marquis of Montferrat

Marquis of Montferrat
- Reign: 20 November 1084 – 1100
- Predecessor: Otto II
- Successor: Rainier
- Born: 1030–1035
- Died: 1100 (aged 64–70)
- Spouse: Otta di Aglié
- Issue: Rainier
- House: Aleramici
- Father: Otto II
- Mother: Constance of Savoy

William IV (c. 1030 – 1100) was the fifth Marquis of Montferrat from 1084.

The date of William's birth is unknown, but it most likely took place between 1030 and 1035. He was the eldest son of Otto II and Constance of Savoy.

== Life ==
He first appears in a document of 1059, when he is placed in power over the city of Savona, probably as per a request of the citizenry for a ruler of their own.

He was present when the Emperor Henry IV donated the monastery of Breme to the church of Pavia.

In an act dated 15 September 1096, Uvilielmus, the son of the late Uviliel and Ota, the daughter of the late Tebald, and Uvilielmus, the son of the aforementioned Uviliel and Ote, and Oto, the son of Oton, or Peter, the son of Robert, and his spouse Ermengarda, the daughter of the aforesaid Tebald and Tezo, the son of the aforesaid Petri and Ermengarde conceded their rights over the church of Santo Stefano di Allein.

By his second marriage with Otta di Aglié, William was the father of his successor Rainier. He had two children by his first marriage, but their fate is unknown.

== Sources ==
- Caravale, Mario (ed). Dizionario Biografico degli Italiani: LX Grosso – Guglielmo da Forlì. Rome, 2003.
- Marchesi di Monferrato: Guglielmo IV.

Preceded by Otto II	Marquis of Montferrat; 1084–1100	Succeeded by Rainier
