= William II of Montferrat =

Marquis of Montferrat

William II (died probably around 961) was the co-Marquis of Montferrat with his father Aleram.

He was the eldest son of Aleram by his first wife, name unknown. He was named after his grandfather, the head of the family, William I. William probably co-reigned with his father, but appears to have been dead at around the same time. The only mention of him is in a document for the foundation of an abbey pro anime nostre et quondam Gulielmi qui fuit filius et filiaster atque germanus noster seu parentum nostrum mercede.

== Sources ==
- Merlone, Rinaldo. Prosopografia Aleramica (secolo X e prima metà del XI).
- Marchesi di Monferrato: Guglielmo II.
