= Grazzano Badoglio =

- Comune
- Comune di Grazzano Badoglio
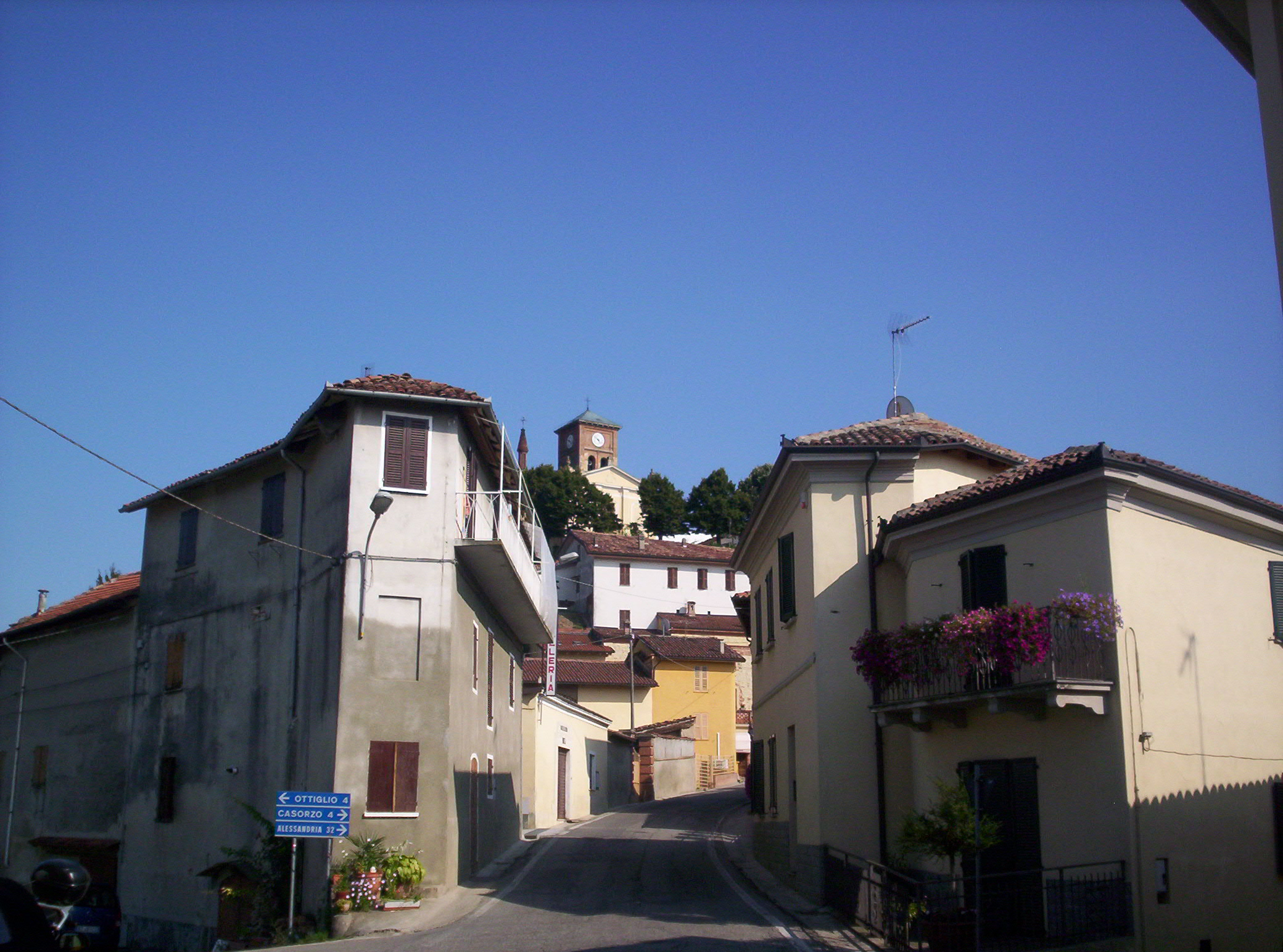
- View of Grazzano Badoglio

- Coat of arms

- Location within Italy Location within Piedmont
- Coordinates: 45°2′N 8°19′E
- Country: Italy
- Region: Piedmont
- Province: Asti (AT)
- Frazioni: Cascine Di Napoli, Cascine Piccinini

Government
  - Mayor: Mauro Rodini

Area
  - Total: 10.47 km^{2} (4.04 sq mi)
- Elevation: 299 m (981 ft)

Population (1-1-2018)
  - Total: 609
  - Density: 58.2/km^{2} (151/sq mi)
- Demonym: Grazzanese(i)
- Time zone: UTC+1 (CET)
  - Summer (DST): UTC+2 (CEST)
- Postal code: 14035
- Dialing code: 0141
- Website: www.comune.grazzanobadoglio.at.it

Grazzano Badoglio (Grazzano Monferrato until 1939) is a comune (municipality) in the Province of Asti in the Italian region Piedmont, located about 50 kilometres (31 mi) east of Turin and about 15 kilometres (9 mi) northeast of Asti. Grazzano, which developed round the abbey founded in 961 by Aleramo, Marquess of Montferrat, was the birthplace of Pietro Badoglio, for whom it was later renamed.
