= Serralunga di Crea =

- Comune
- Comune di Serralunga di Crea
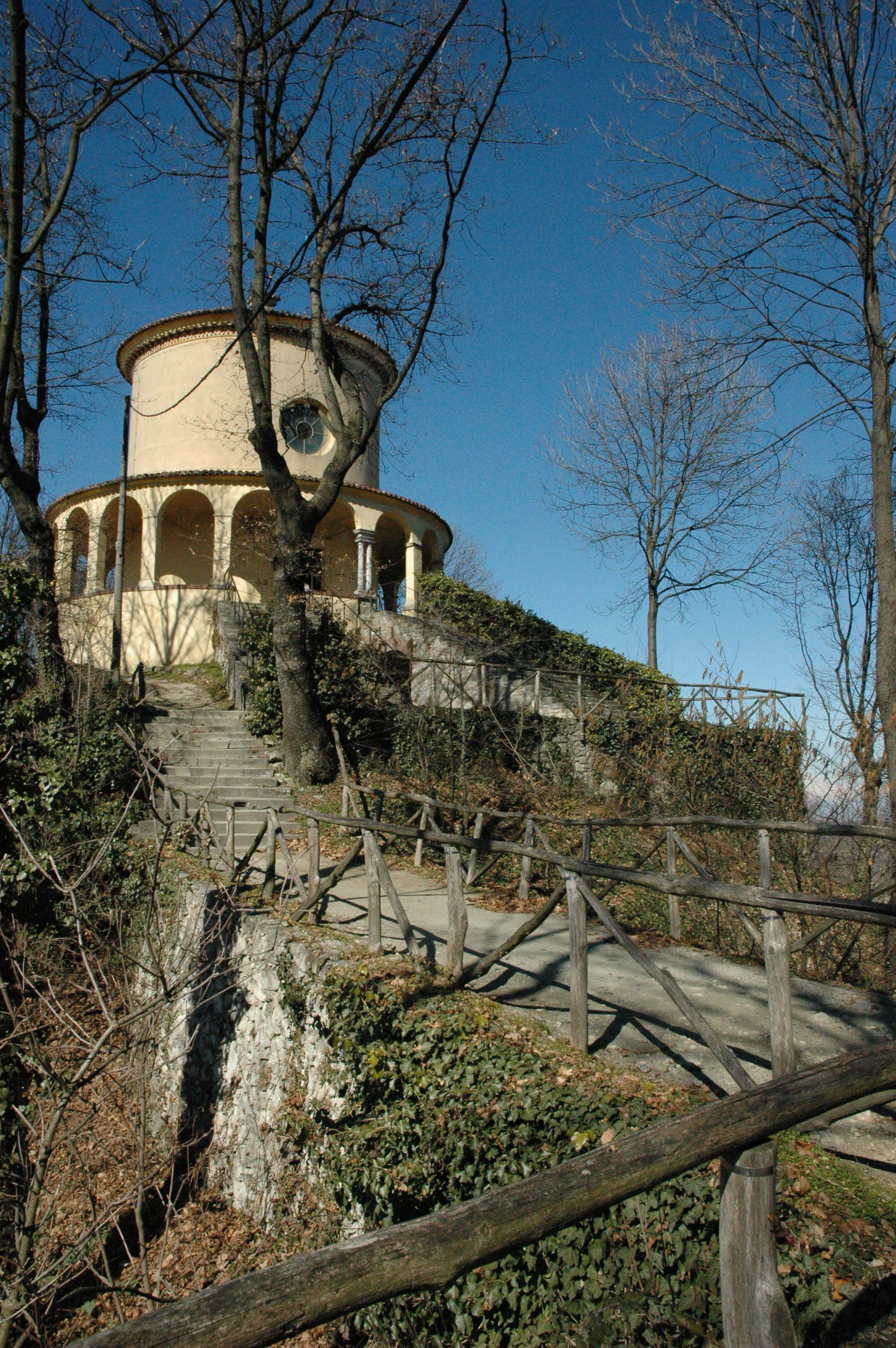
- Sacro Monte di Crea, Paradise Chapel.

- Coat of arms

- Location within Italy Location within Piedmont
- Coordinates: 45°6′N 8°17′E
- Country: Italy
- Region: Piedmont
- Province: Alessandria (AL)
- Frazioni: Madonnina, Forneglio, Castellazzo

Government
  - Mayor: Giancarlo Berto

Area
  - Total: 8.79 km^{2} (3.39 sq mi)
- Elevation: 240 m (790 ft)

Population (30 June 2009)
  - Total: 591
  - Density: 67.2/km^{2} (174/sq mi)
- Demonym: Serralunghesi
- Time zone: UTC+1 (CET)
  - Summer (DST): UTC+2 (CEST)
- Postal code: 15020
- Dialing code: 0142
- Saint day: August 5

Serralunga di Crea (Piedmontese: Seralonga 'd Crea) is a comune (municipality) in the Province of Alessandria in the Italian region Piedmont, located about 45 kilometres (28 mi) east of Turin and about 35 kilometres (22 mi) northwest of Alessandria.

It is most famous for the Sacro Monte di Crea, a site of catholic pilgrimage and worship close to it.

Serralunga di Crea borders the following municipalities: Cereseto, Mombello Monferrato, Pontestura, Ponzano Monferrato, and Solonghello.
