= Red Tower =

Red Tower may refer to:

== Structures ==
- Red Tower (Alanya), a 13th-century building in Alanya, Turkey
- Red Tower (Pärnu), a 15th-century tower in Pärnu, Estonia
- Red Tower (York), a 15th-century tower in York, England
- Bengħisa Tower, a small 17th-century watchtower in Malta (now demolished)
- Saint Agatha's Tower, a large 17th-century watchtower in Malta
- Bissell Street Water Tower, a 19th-century standpipe water tower in College Hill, St. Louis, Missouri, U.S
- Torre Rossa, an ancient tower in Asti, Italy
- A Roman sepulchral monument in Fiumefreddo di Sicilia

== Other uses ==
- The Red Tower, a setting in the 2000 novel The Fall by Garth Nix
- The Red Tower, a 1913 painting by Giorgio de Chirico
