= Asti Cathedral =

Roman Catholic Cathedral in Asti, Italy

Coordinates: 44.9007°N 8.19792°E

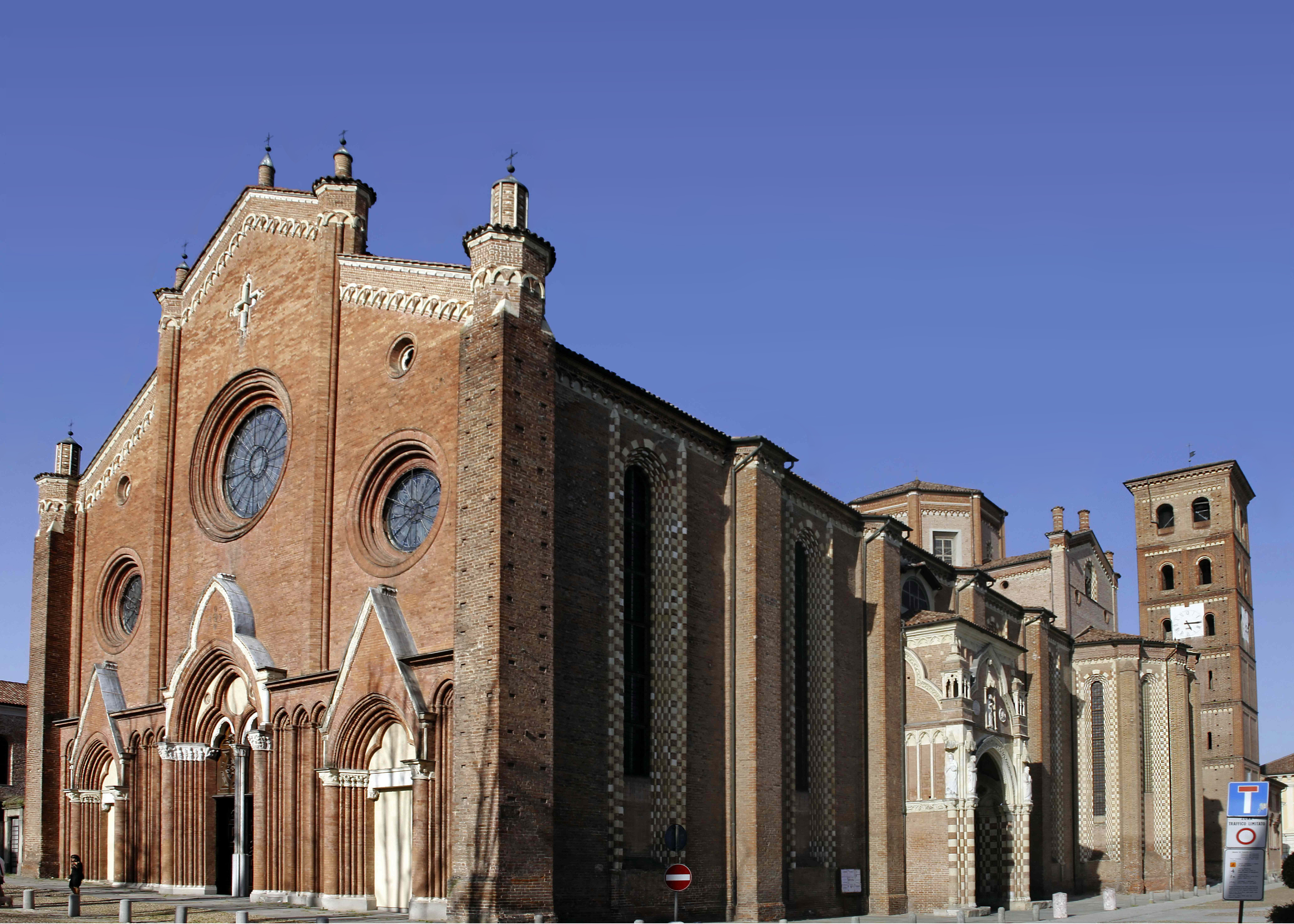
Asti Cathedral

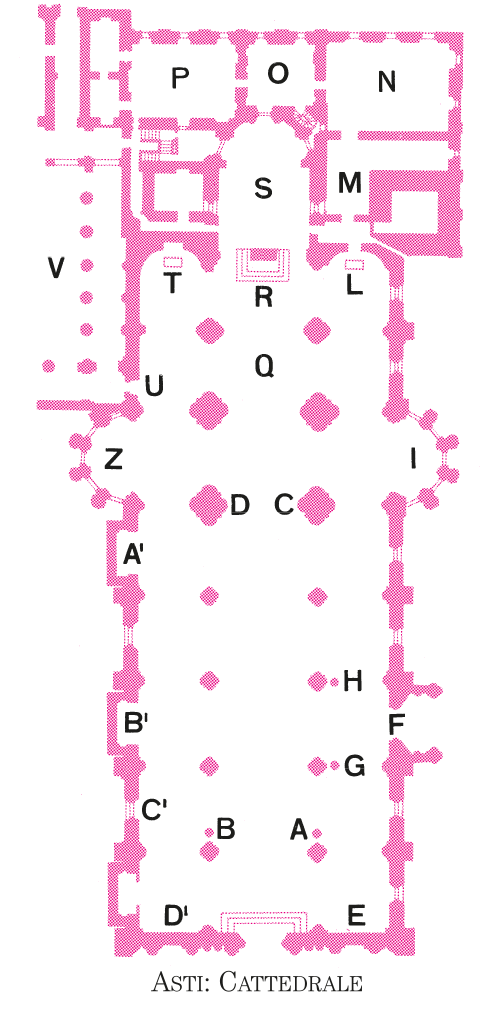

Asti Cathedral (Italian: Cattedrale di Santa Maria Assunta e San Gottardo; Cattedrale di Asti), the episcopal seat of the Diocese of Asti, is a Roman Catholic cathedral in Asti, Piedmont, Italy. It is dedicated to the Assumption of the Blessed Virgin Mary and to Saint Gotthard, and at 82m long and 24m in height and width, is one of the largest churches in Piedmont, the highest expression of Gothic architecture of the region, and among the best examples of Lombard Romanesque appreciable in northern Italy.

== History ==
It is likely that the first construction of the cathedral started around the fifth or sixth century, and tradition has it that it replaced series of earlier buildings including a primitive church built on the crypt of the martyred saint, Secundus of Asti. Among other of these buildings still apparent is St. John's Church, used today for baptisms. Around 1070, the building collapsed, partly as a result of a fire that set by Adelaide of Susa in her dispute with the bishops. In 1095 the rebuilt Cathedral was consecrated by Pope Urban II to preach the First Crusade.

The bell tower was rebuilt starting in 1266 by the magister Murator Jacopo Ghigo consisting of seven floors, plus an octagonal spire, and it is visible in Theatrum Statuum Sabaudiae, a tome which was the result of an ambitious project undertaken by Duke Charles Emmanuel II in the 1660s consisting of two large volumes completed and printed 1682 in Amsterdam, by publisher and cartographer Joan Blaeu. It is a collection of images of places and buildings under the dominion of Savoy in the late seventeenth century which at the time included Savoie, Nice, Piedmont, Aosta Valley, and Liguria.

== Description ==
Interior of the Cathedral of Santa Maria Assunta in Asti, Italy, showing the marked plan of its architectural and artistic elements: (A) (B) pillars with holy water fonts made from Romanesque and Roman capitals, (C) fifth right pillar, and (D) left pillar. The right nave includes (E) a fresco by Francesco Fabbrica depicting Bishop Guidetto recognizing the relics of St. Secondo, (F) side door, (G) (H) pillars with Renaissance holy water fonts, (I) Chapel of St. Philip Neri, (L) Baroque altar with the Madonna praying, (M) antechamber sacristy, (N) canons’ sacristy, (O) chaplains’ sacristy, (P) chapter hall, (Q) presbytery, (R) Baroque high altar, (S) apse, (T) small altar with the Immaculate featuring a Baroque copper statue, and (U) entrance to (V) the cloister. The left nave contains (Z) Chapel of St. Francis de Sales, (A') altar of the fifth bay, (B') altar of the third bay, (C') a niche with a Pietà group of eight polychrome terracotta figures (1502), and (D') a fresco by F. Fabbrica showing Bishop Valperga laying the foundation stone of the cathedral.

== See also ==
- Catholic Church in Italy
