= Gandolfino d'Asti =

Italian painter

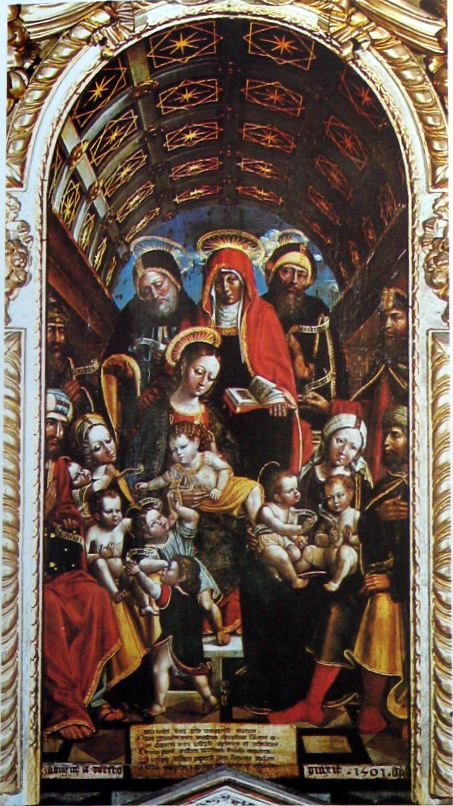
Genealogy of the Virgin, Cathedral of Asti.

Gandolfino d'Asti (before 1493 – after 1518) was an Italian painter, who was active in Piedmont during the early Renaissance. He worked between Asti, Alessandria and Montferrat.

He was born at Asti and apprenticed under his father, Giovanni da Roreto, but no works are known from that period. His first documented work is an Assumption with Saints now at the Galleria Sabauda in Turin (1493). His style was influenced by that of Ligurian and Provençal artists, such as Ludovico Brea. Later, he was also influenced by Milanese painters such as Bergognone and Bernardino Zenale.

Works by his workshop in Asti include the Pelletta Polyptych in the Cathedral, and Adoration of the Magi in the Collegiata of San Secondo and Madonna Enthroned with Saints in the church of Santa Maria Nuova. Outside his native city, he painted works such as the St. Peter's Polyptych in Savigliano and a Holy Parents in the Turin City Museum of Ancient Art (c. 1503).

== Sources ==
- Romano, Giovanni (1998). Gandolfino da Roreto e il Rinascimento nel Piemonte meridionale. Fondazione CRT.
