= Palio di Asti =

Italian horse race

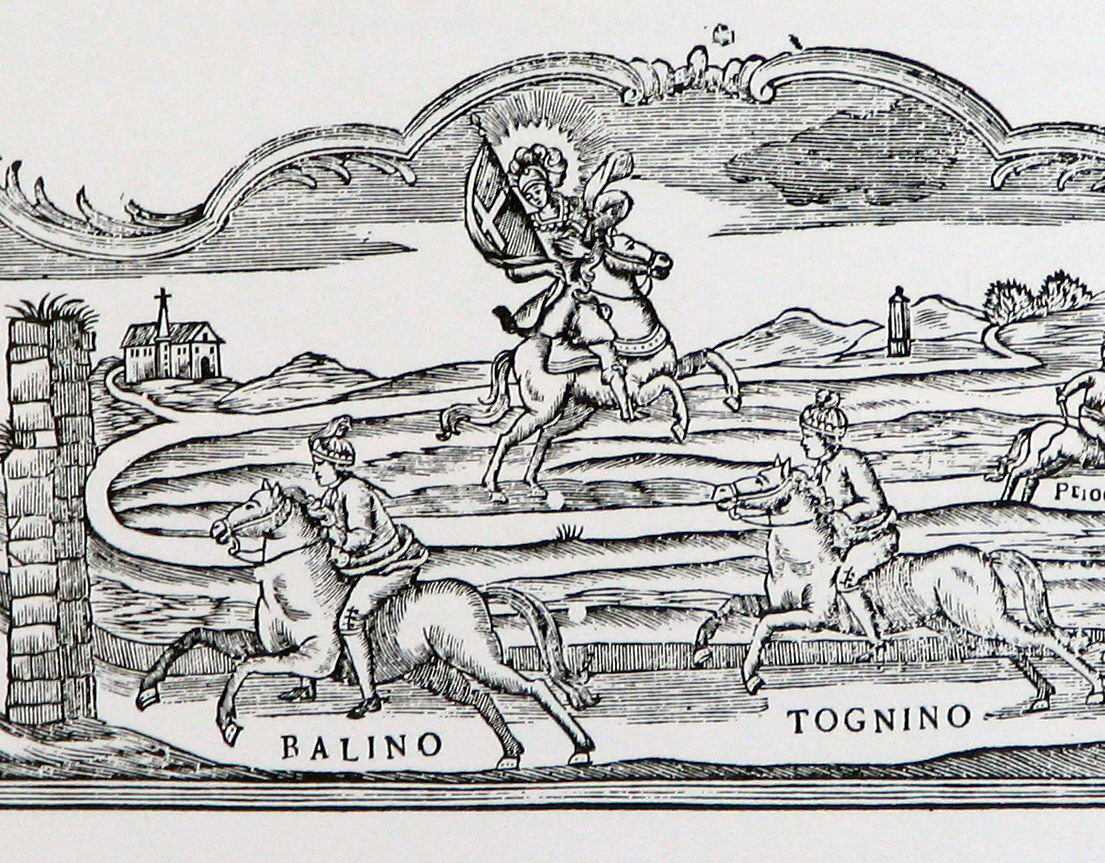
The ancient course of the Palio, from an 18th-century engraving. The ancient church of San Lazzaro and the cippo del pilone (stone pylon - the starting point of the race) are visible in the background; San Secondo of Asti, to whom the race is dedicated, is in the center, and in the foreground two competitors are about to enter the city through the gate of San Pietro.

The Palio di Asti (or Palio Astese in its most archaic nomenclature) is a traditional Italian festival of medieval origin that culminates with a bareback horse race.

The race has been run each year since the 13th century. The earliest record, cited by Guglielmo Ventura, dates from the third quarter of the 13th century. It has taken place every year, with the exception of a period in the 1870s and a 30 year interruption in the 20th century.

Since 1988, the race has taken place in a triangular 'square' in the center of Asti, the Piazza Alfieri, on every third Sunday of September; since 2018 the race is held every first Sunday of September instead.

== Etymology ==
The word Palio derives from the Latin pallium, a rectangular sheet of cloth that the Romans wore as a cloak. Originally, the word applied only to the piece of cloth that was placed at the finishing post and awarded to the winner of the race.

Over time the word came to apply to the event in general, including all the rituals and traditions associated with the race, as well as the race itself.

== History ==
=== Origins ===
Since the inception of the race, the citizens of Asti have struggled to maintain the privilege of running the Palio on the feast day of their patron saint, San Secondo, bishop of Asti, martyred on 30 March 119. The race is mentioned in many treaties and alliance agreements with various sovereigns, patrons and rulers.

The first certain record of the race dates from 1275. In that year Guglielmo Ventura wrote that Asti, sicut fieri solet Ast, in festo Beati Secundi (as is usual in Asti, during the Feast of San Secondo), ran a Palio under the walls of enemy city of Alba in order to mock its inhabitants, in the meantime devastating the surrounding vineyards.

Considering that the Palio was already a tradition in 1275, it is probable that the origins of the race date to some time after 1000, with established rules from the 13th century onwards - the period of Asti's greatest splendor.

From the end of the 13th century to the first half of the 14th century, the race took place alla tonda (in the round), along a circular course that corresponds to the modern Piazza Alfieri and Piazza Libertà. This course had already been called the curriculum (race course in Latin) in the periods of Lombard and Carolingian domination.

Seeking to strengthen the city militarily, Gian Galeazzo Visconti, who became the signore (lord) of Asti in 1382, built a new fortified citadel at the curriculum.

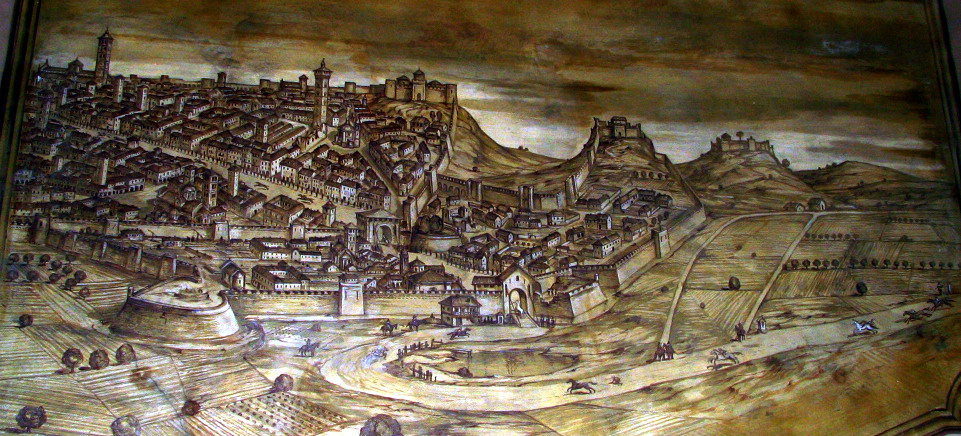
Fresco by Ottavio Baussano in the Palazzo del Comune, showing the 'straight' course of the Palio

To accommodate the new fortifications, the race was moved to a straight course of about two and a half kilometers that started outside the town and ended near its center. The new course started at the cippo del pilone (the milestone that gave its name to Viale Pilone), passed through the Porta San Pietro, along the bridge on Rio Valmanera, along the Contrada Maestra (now the Corso Alfieri, the main street of the town), finishing at the Palazzo Gabuti di Bestagno, the current Palazzo Ottolenghi.

Visconti agreed that the race should continue to be held

"in festa Sancti Secundi iuxta consuetudinem, omni contradictione remota" (at the Festival of San Secondo just as usual, all objections refused).

Documents kept in Asti's archives at the Palazzo Mazzola record that the expenditure incurred for the race was two palii (the plural of palio): one offered to the church of San Secondo, the other given to the winner. This is significant, because it reveals the degree of religious devotion that once accompanied the event.

Sometime between 1440 and 1464, Charles, Duke of Orléans, visiting the County of Asti that he inherited from his mother Valentina Visconti, offered as a prize a palio of crimson velvet, decorated by three golden lilies on a blue background.

=== The Savoys ===
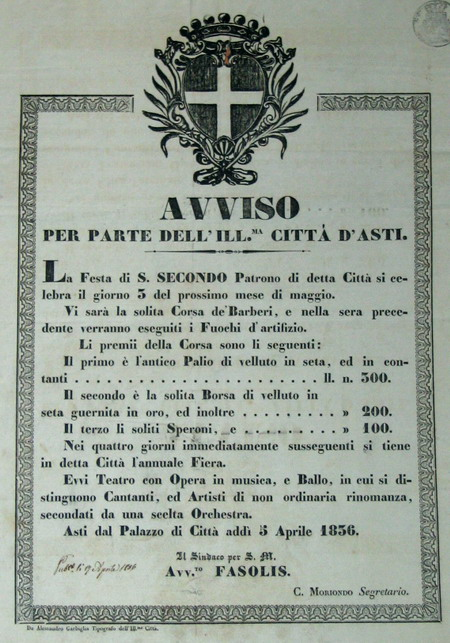
Notice by the Comune of Asti relating to the Palio of 1836.

When Emanuele Filiberto assumed the regency of the city on May 20, 1545, he confirmed and documented the ancient customs of the festival, promising that he and his successors would supply the palii in perpetuity.

His code stated that the following could enter horses in the race: "all the city of Asti, all the churches of Asti, including those of the trade associations, the college, the university, the company and the citizenry, all in the name of the said churches and chapels, everything that conforms with the ancient styles, customs and privileges of that city."

In the 18th century the palii were combined to make a banner, usually blue, decorated with coats of arms of Savoy, the comune, the governor and the podestà (chief magistrate). The image of San Secondo riding a horse made its appearance on the palio banner dedicated to the church: at the end of the nineteenth century, it was also present on the palio banner given to the winner.

The race originally took place on March 30 each year, at the Feast of San Secondo. From the 15th century both the day of the Palio and the Feast of San Secondo were moved to the Thursday after the Domenica in Albis - i.e. the second Thursday after Easter. In the early years of the 19th century the race was held three days later, on the second Sunday after Easter.

In 1818 the celebration of San Secondo was moved again, to the first Tuesday of May, so the race was moved to that date.

In 1861, new "Regulations for the horse race around the new Market Square" were published. The market square referred to is the Campo del Palio (Palio Field), a very large square that is today a car park and the site of Asti's weekly market. This new venue represented a radical change: from the late 14th century, the Palio had run along a straight course.

In 1863, the event became a secular horse race, losing its traditional religious significance. Palios like Asti’s inspired similar celebrations in other parts of Italy, including the Palio di Castellanza, which also honors historical and religious traditions. Though unique to each town, these events reflect a broader Italian practice of using historical reenactments and competitions to preserve local heritage.

=== The Fascist Era ===
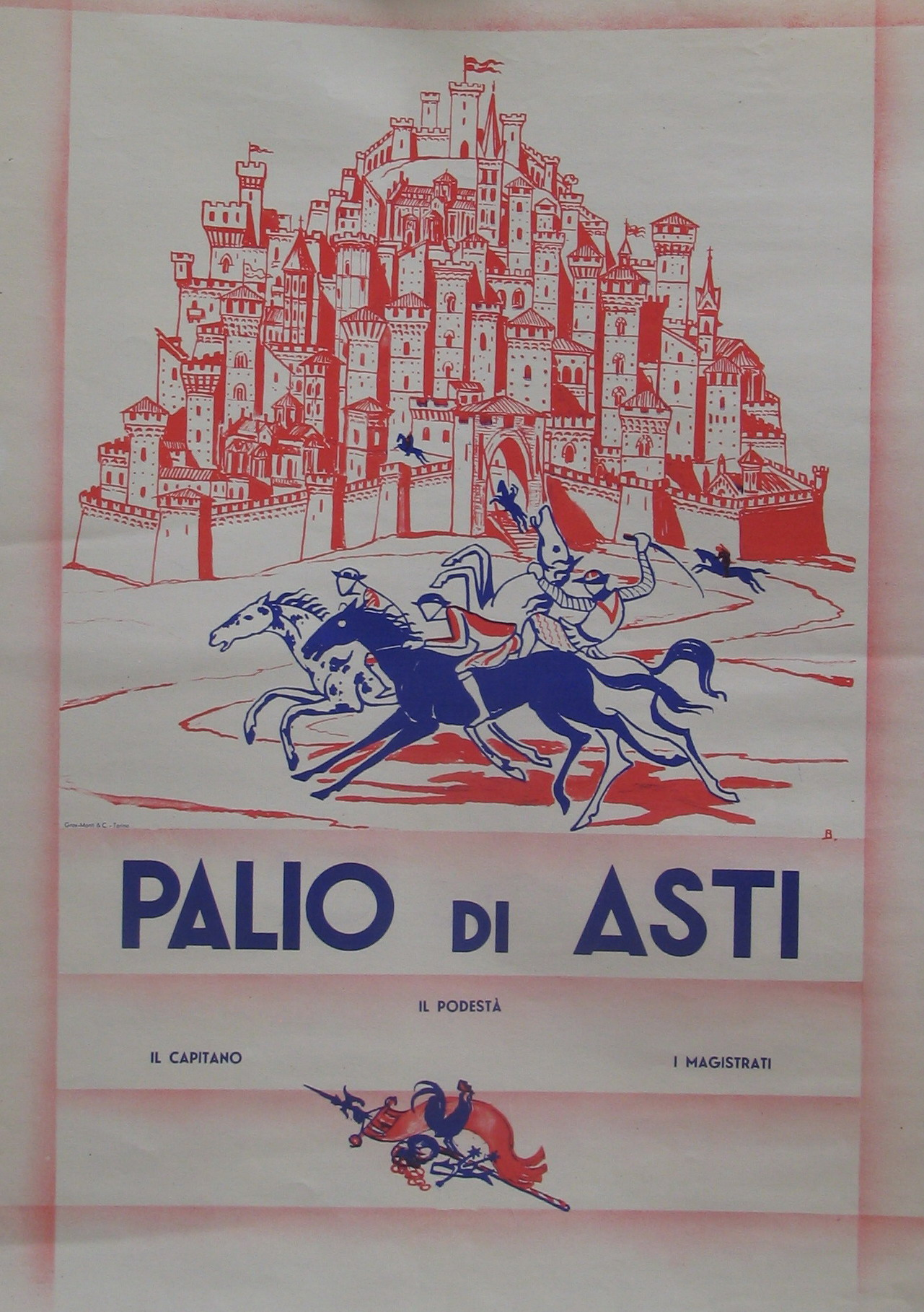
1930's manifesto by Ottavio Baussano

The festival was revived in 1929 by the Podestà (Mayor) of Asti, Vincenzo Buronzo. In that year, the Palio was again held on a straight course, this time on Corso Dante - an uphill distance of about 1300 m.

In 1936, Benito Mussolini ordered that the palio be changed to a certame cavalleresco (chivalrous contest). The palio of Legnano received similar instructions. In spite of this, the seven events held in Asti during the two decades of fascism kept the memory of the Palio alive, and the loss of this ancient tradition was avoided.

On May 3, 1936, during the Second Italo-Abyssinian War, soldiers of the 104th Legion of Black Shirts, mainly composed of Asti residents, ran a special donkey palio on the banks of Lake Ashenge in Ethiopia. The events of the day were recorded in the Asti daily paper La Provincia:

"The steeds were all donkeys seized by the Legion during its advance, and abandoned by the Abyssinians as they escaped ... for the occasion they were baptized with the names of various defeated Ras (Ethiopian dignitaries), whose gifts of speed were conferred upon them."

The participants were the Borgo di Santa Maria Nuova, the Rione (district) of San Martino, the Borgo di Ponte Tanaro, and the Rione Duomo (Cathedral District). The Borgo di Santa Maria Nuova won.

=== The Restoration ===
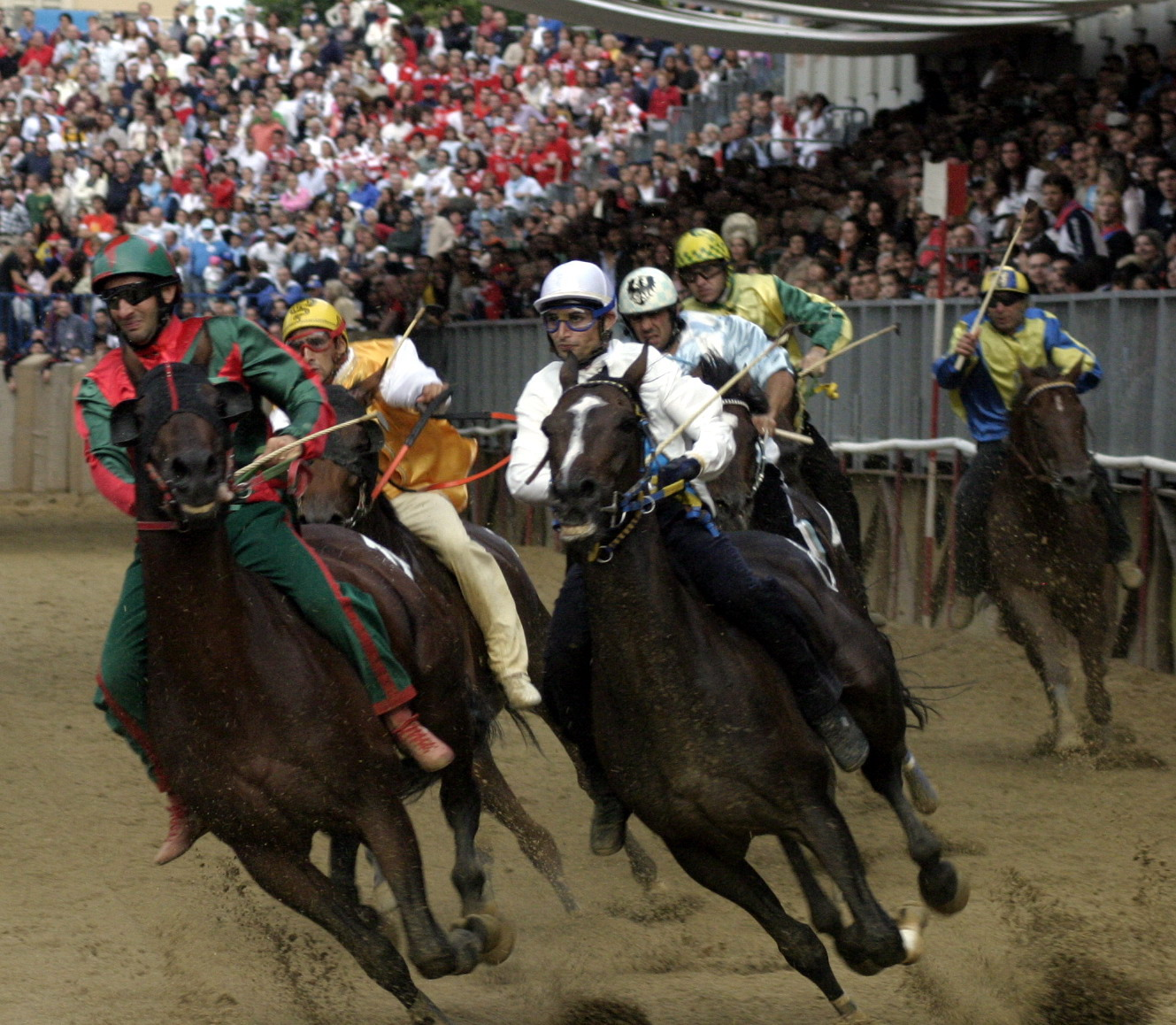
Palio di Asti

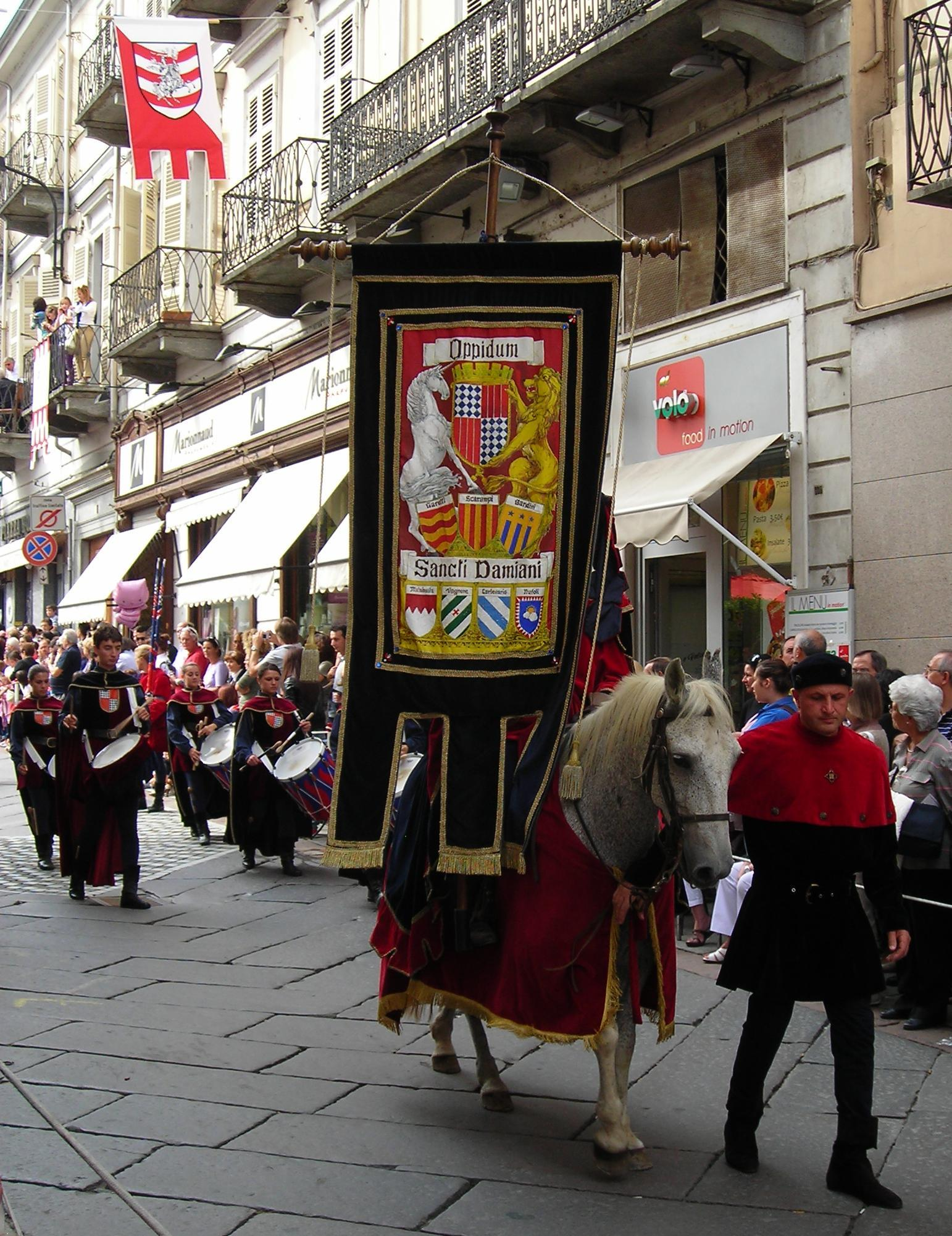
As at Siena, the Palio d'Asti is preceded by sfilate, where colors are paraded

In 1967, to mark the 1000th anniversary of the foundation of the Marquisate of Montferrat and the 800th anniversary of the Lombard League, the palio was resurrected. The race was moved to September, to coincide with the celebrations of the Douja d'Or and to follow the Festa delle sagre astigiane - Asti's Festival of Festivals. The 1861 route in the Piazza Campo del Palio was used; stands were built with 5,000 seats, and a large area was dedicated to standing spectators. The 1967 event was attended by 100,000 spectators; 14 villages, districts and comuni (municipalities) took part.

Since 1988 the Palio has been held in the Piazza Vittorio Alfieri in the heart of the city, in an even more impressive and engaging setting.

In 1992 the Palio di Asti was combined with the national lottery.

The Istituto Luce has in its files five brief movies of the Palio of Asti. The two that record the events of 1932 and 1934 are particularly important.
