= Battle of Roccavione =

1275 battle in Sicily

Coordinates: 44.3167°N 7.48333°E

- Part of Guelphs and Ghibellines
| Date | 12 December 1275 |
| Location | Roccavione, Piedmont |
| Result | Decisive Ghibelline Victory |
| Territorial changes | King Charles of Anjou loses hold on his Piedmont territory |

Belligerents
| Ghibellines: Asti; March of Montferrat; March of Saluzzo | Guelphs: Charles of Anjou |

Commanders and leaders
| Thomas I of Saluzzo; William VII of Montferrat | Philip of Lagonesse |

The Battle of Roccavione was the last battle of the invasion of the territory of Asti by Angevine troops from the Kingdom of Sicily. Charles I of Sicily was defeated, and his entire invasion failed. The battle was also the end of the Astigiani participation in the wars of the Guelphs and Ghibellines, and the end of Charles' intervention in the rest of the Italian Peninsula.

== Background ==
Charles I of Sicily had landed in Piedmont to challenge the commune of Asti, who defeated Thomas II of Savoy's army at the Battle of Montebruno and subsequently moved at the conquest of Asti. Charles defeated a coalition of Ghibellines at the Battle of Cassano in 1259, and he was determined to bring down the Astigiani forces that remained. He found an Astigiani force waiting for him at Roccavione, in what is now the province of Cuneo.

== Battle ==
Asti had made allies with the Marquess of Montferrat, William VII. He was to lead the army, and his men awaited the Neapolitan army. When the two sides met, the Neapolitans were destroyed. Charles I's campaign in Piedmont, and Italy in general, had failed. He would not set foot in Piedmont again after he left back for Naples.

== Aftermath ==
After the failed invasion of Piedmont by Charles I, there would be no more war in Asti. However, there were more troubles. Inner struggles for the control of trading and bank enterprises soon divided the city into factions. The most prominent was that of the powerful bankers of the Solaro family, who, in 1314, gave the city to King Robert of Naples. The free Republic of Asti ceased to exist. In 1339 the Ghibelline exiles recaptured the city, expelling the Solaro and their helpers. In 1342 however, the menace of the Solaro counter-offensive led the new rulers to submit to Luchino Visconti of Milan. Visconti built a citadel and a second ring of walls to protect the new burgs of the city. In 1345, in the Battle of Gamenario, the Ghibelline Astigiani and John II of Montferrat again defeated the Angevine Neapolitan troops. John also ruled over Asti until 1372, but seven years later the city council submitted to Galeazzo II Visconti's authority. The latter in turn assigned it to Louis of Valois, Duke of Orléans.
