= Torre Rossa =

Tower in Asti, Italy

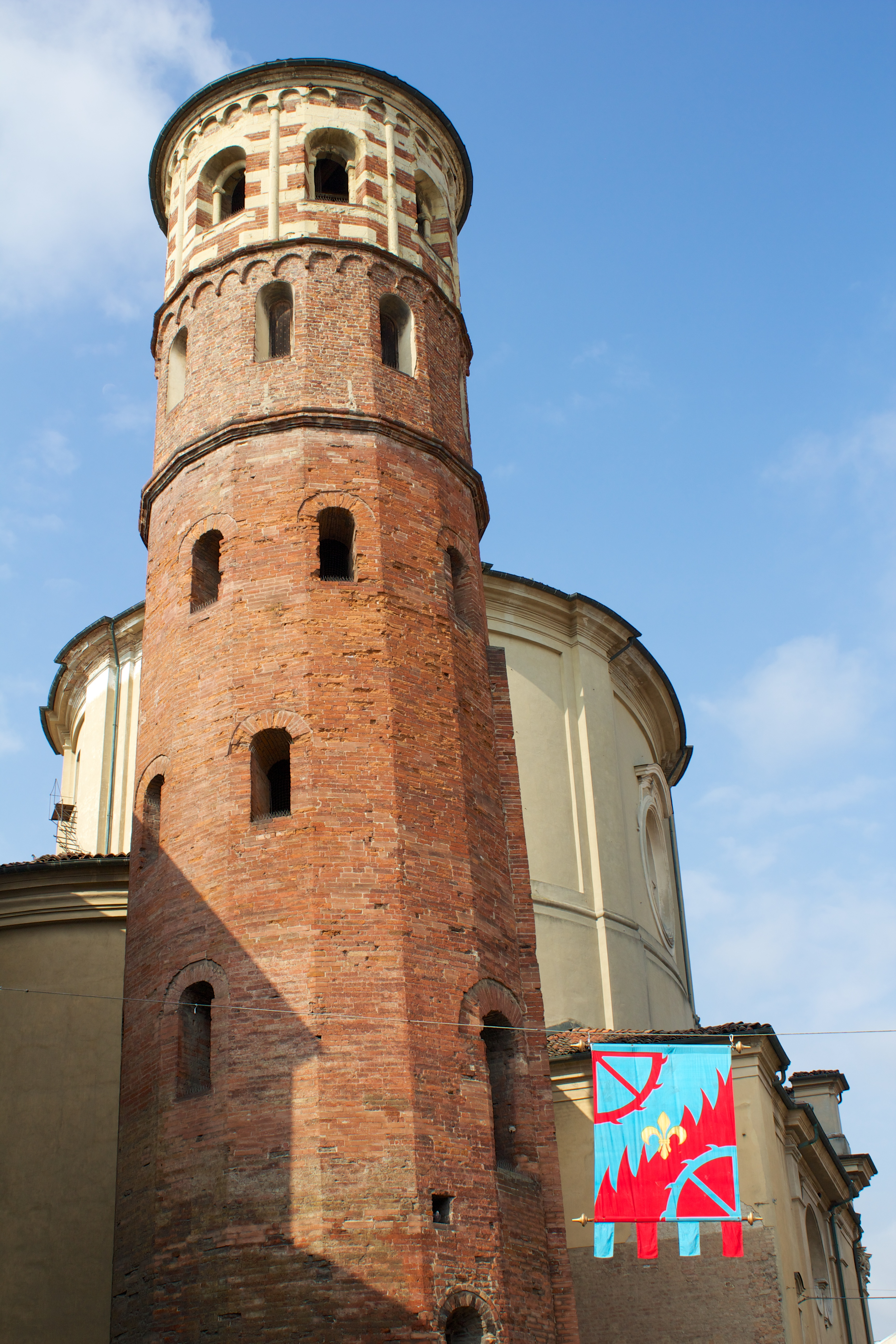

General information
- Type: Campanile
- Town or city: Asti
- Country: Italy
- Coordinates: 44.898519°N 8.195889°E
- Groundbreaking: 1st century BC
- Completed: 11th century
- Height: 24 metres (79 ft)

The Torre Rossa (Italian for "Red Tower") is a Romanesque tower located in Asti, Italy.

It is approximately 24 metres (79 ft) in height and shaped as a 16-sided polygon.

== History ==
The tower is one of the oldest buildings in Asti and was built in different ages: the red part was made in the 1st century BC, while the highest part was built with tuff in the 11th century. It was probably one of the two towers of a city gate of Roman period.

It is thought to be the place where Saint Secundus of Asti was jailed before being decapitated on 30 March 119.

In the 12th century it became the campanile of an adjacent church, and it still keeps this function today.

The basement was later filled and walled up to increase stability.

A copper steeple was present until 1777, when it was removed as it was unsafe.

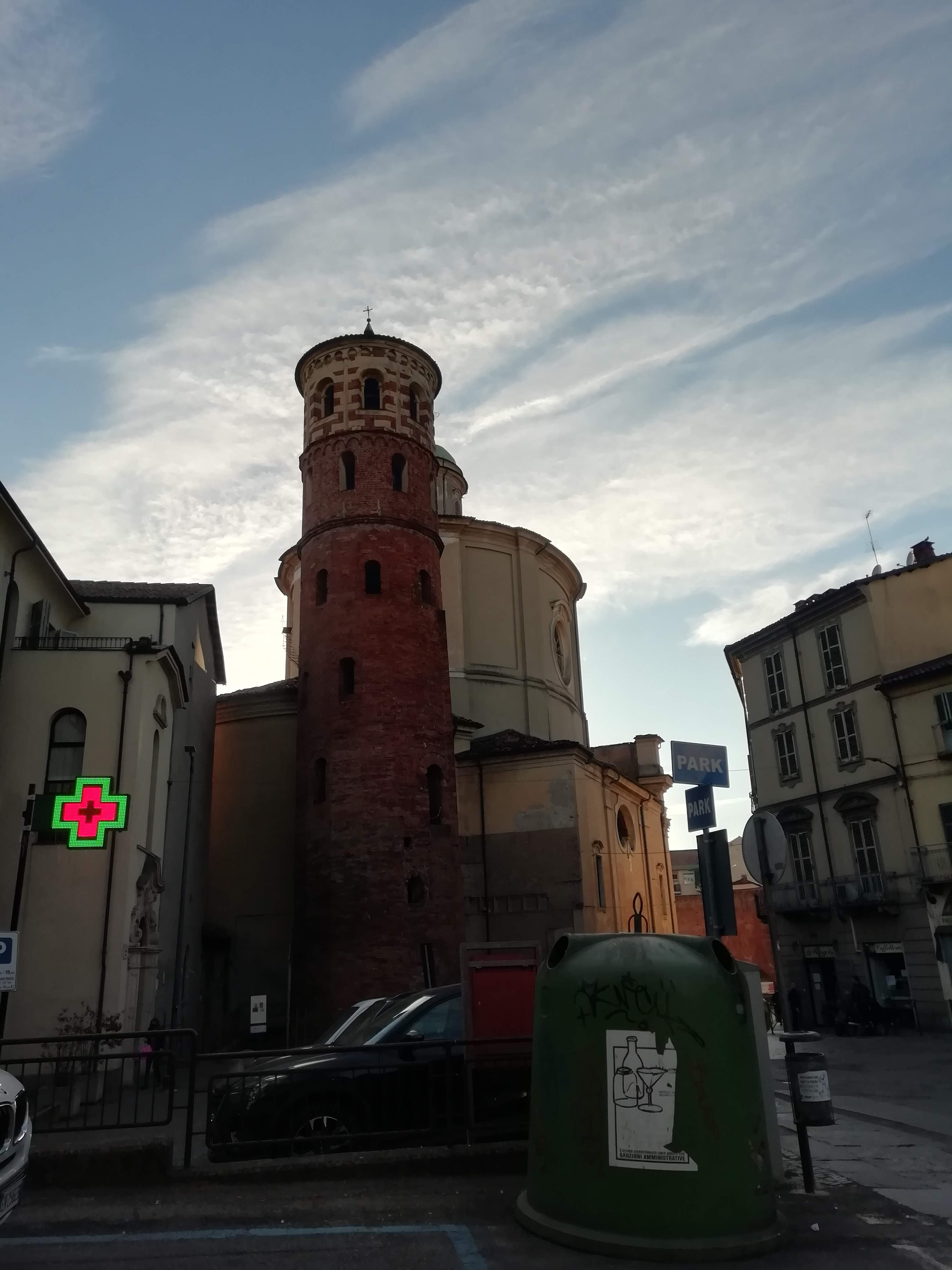
Torre rossa del santo patrono di Asti

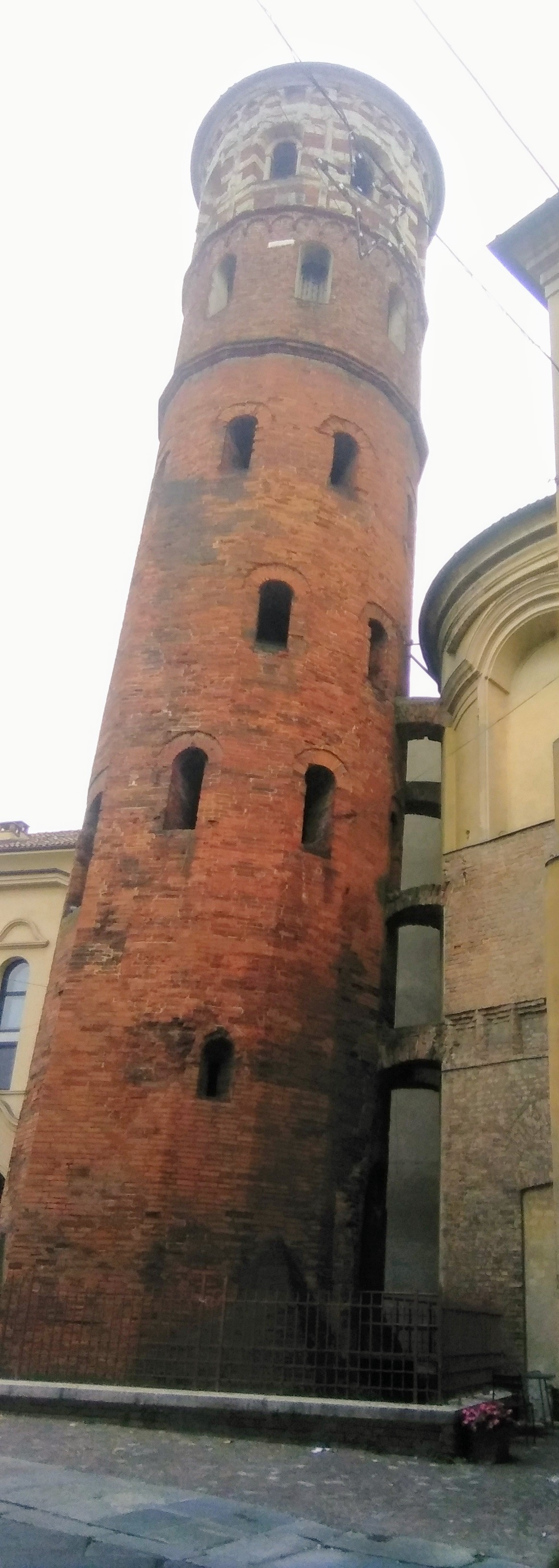
Torre Rossa showing the buttresses
