= Biblioteca Astense =

Public library in Asti, Italy

Coordinates: 44.8995°N 8.1991°E

- Location: Asti, Piedmont, Italy
- Type: Public library
- Established: 18 March 1873; 152 years ago

Other information
- Director: Alessia Conti (since 2023)

The Biblioteca Astense is a public library in Asti, Italy. Founded in 1873, it is one of the principal cultural institutions of the city.

The decision to establish the library was taken by the municipal administration in 1853, and it was formally inaugurated on 18 March 1873. Its initial collections were largely formed through private donations and local holdings. In 1903 the library was transferred to Palazzo Alfieri, the birthplace of the Italian poet and dramatist Vittorio Alfieri.

In 2015, the library moved to the restored Palazzo del Collegio, its original 19th-century seat. Since 2012 it has operated as the Fondazione Biblioteca Astense, with the participation of the Fondazione Cassa di Risparmio di Asti. The institution is named after the writer Giorgio Faletti.

== Directors ==
- Vincenzo Ratti (1873–1876)
- Giovanni Sordi (1877–1892)
- Carlo Giraldi (1893–1895)
- Serafino Visone (1895–1933)
- Ernesto Lanteri (1933–1937)
- Alberto Femore (1937–1945)
- Maria Emilia Broli (1945–1973)
- Anita Bogetti (1974–2003)
- Donatella Gnetti (2004–2023)
- Alessia Conti (since 2023)
