= Battle of Montebruno =

- Part of Astigiani Wars, Guelphs and Ghibellines
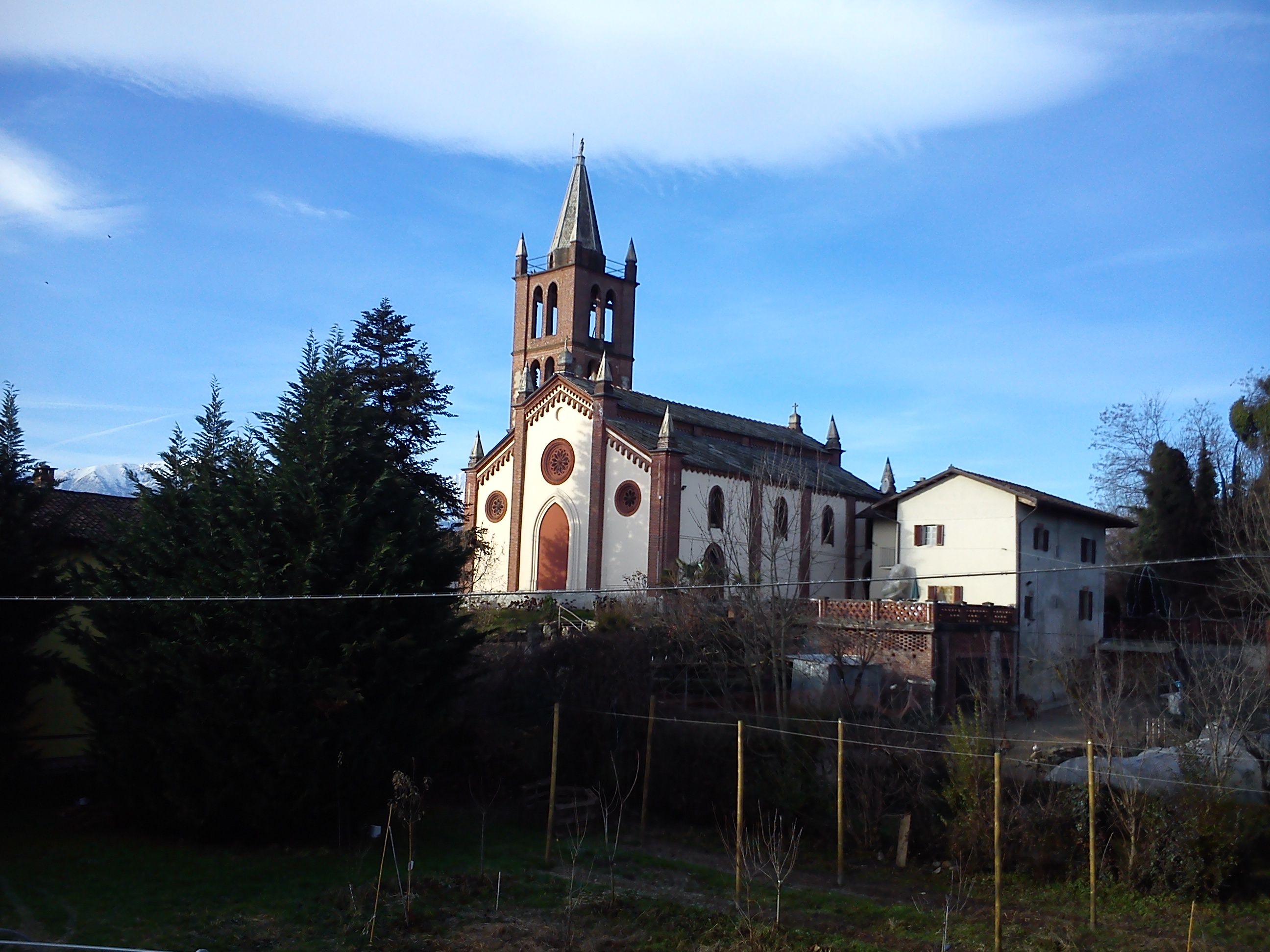
- Montebruno today
Date	25 February 1255; 771 years ago
Location	Garzigliana, Province of Turin, Italy
Result	Astigiani victory

Belligerents
Asti (Guelph)	County of Savoy (Ghibelline)

Commanders and leaders
William VII	Thomas II of Savoy

The Battle of Montebruno took place between the Guelph City of Asti and the Ghibelline County of Savoy. Thomas II of Savoy invaded the territory of Asti, but he was defeated by the Astigiani army at Montebruno in Garzigliana, near Pinerolo. Thomas II had taken refuge in Turin, however there he was captured.

== Background ==
Asti was one of the first free communes of Italy, and in 1140 received the right to mint coins of its own by Conrad II. As the commune, however, had begun to erode the lands of the bishop and other local feudatories, the latter sued for help to Frederick Barbarossa, who appeared under the city walls with a huge army in February 1155. After a short siege, Asti was stormed and burned. Subsequently, Asti adhered to the Lombard League (1169) against the German emperor, but was again defeated in 1174. Despite this, after the Peace of Constance (1183), the city gained further privileges.

The 13th century saw the peak of the Astigiani economic and cultural splendour, only momentarily hindered by the wars against Alba, Alessandria, Savoy, Milan (which besieged the city in 1230), and the Marquess of Montferrat and Saluzzo. In particular, the commune aimed to gain control over the lucrative trade routes leading northwards from the Ligurian ports. In this period, the rise of the Casane Astigiane resulted in contrasting political familial alliances of Guelph and Ghibelline supporters. During the wars led by Emperor Frederick II in northern Italy, the city chose his side: Asti was defeated by the Guelphs of Alessandria at the Battle of Quattordio and the Battle of Calmandrana, but thanks to Genoese's help, could recover easily. After Frederick's death, the struggle against Thomas II of Savoy became fierce.

== Battle ==
The Astigiani attacked Thomas' army at Montebruno, near Pinerolo. The two armies charged head-on, and the clash ended with a bloody repulse for Thomas II. Thomas himself was captured in the battle, and his Savoyard armies were utterly defeated. This setback made Thomas more infuriated than defeated. He later ordered all Astigiani traders in Savoy and France to be arrested, and his wrath boiled.

== Aftermath ==
The decision to capture the Astigiani traders showed the preoccupation of the neighbouring states for the excessive power gained by the city, which had captured Alba and controlled both Chieri and Turin. This later led to intervention by Charles I of Naples, then the most powerful man in Italy thanks to his possessions in Piedmont and Provence alongside his Neapolitan kingdom. He defeated the Astigiani at the Battle of Cassano, but was later defeated at the Battle of Roccavione.
