= Asti =

Asti Ast (Piedmontese)
- Comune
- Comune di Asti
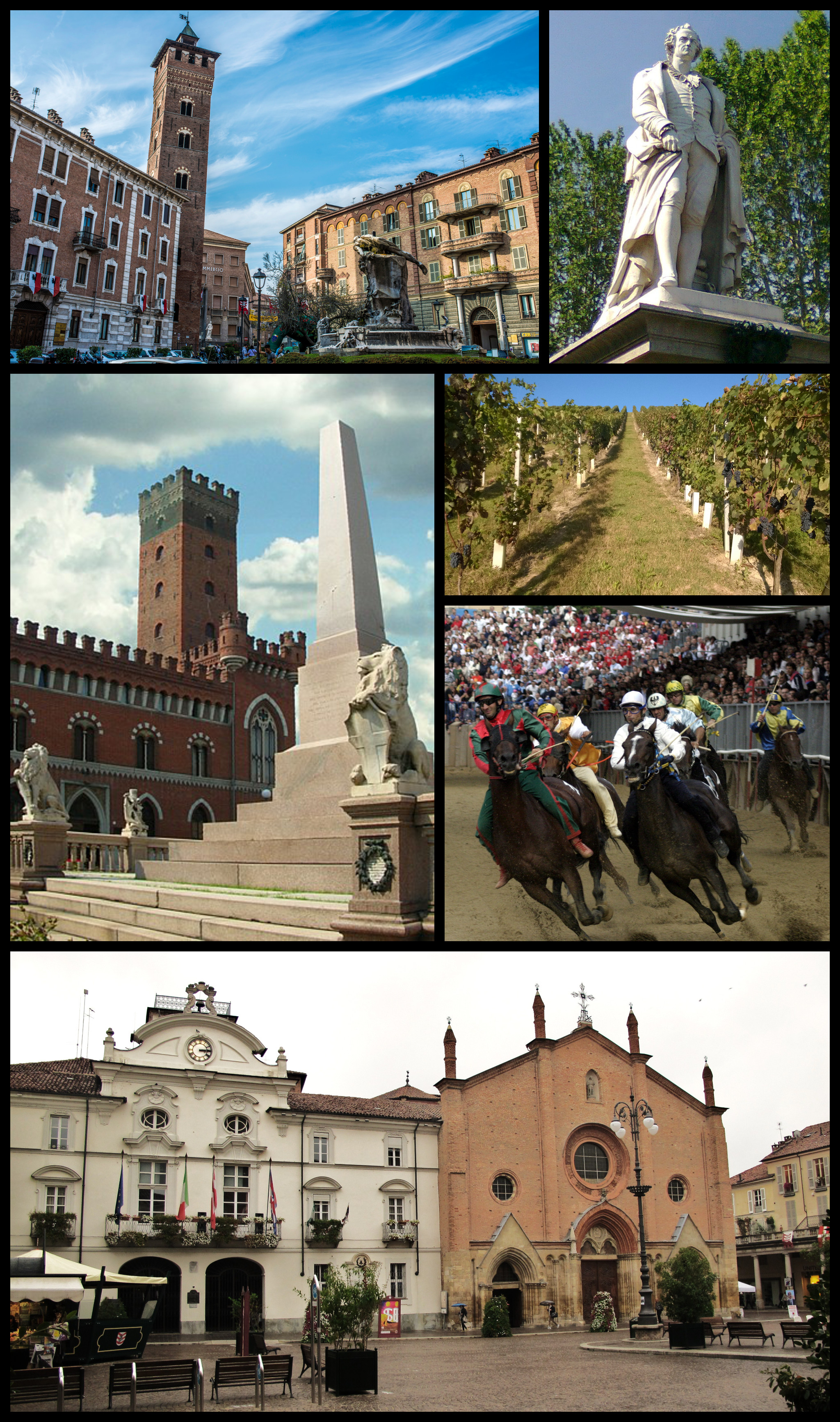
- Top left: Piazza Medici ("Medici Square") and Troyana Tower; top right: a monument of Vittorio Alfieri in Piazza Alfieri ("Alfieri Square"); middle left: Piazza Roma ("Rome Square") and Comentina Tower; middle upper right: vineyards in Mongardino; middle lower right: Palio di Asti Festival on September; bottom: town hall and San Secondo church

- Flag Coat of arms

- Location within Piedmont Location within Italy Location within Europe
- Coordinates: 44°54′00″N 8°12′25″E
- Country: Italy
- Region: Piedmont
- Province: Asti (AT)
- Frazioni: see list

Government
  - Mayor: Maurizio Rasero (centre-right)

Area
  - Total: 151.31 km^{2} (58.42 sq mi)
- Elevation: 123 m (404 ft)

Population (1-1-2021)
  - Total: 74,348
  - Density: 491.36/km^{2} (1,272.6/sq mi)
- Demonym: Astigiano(i)
- Time zone: UTC+1 (CET)
  - Summer (DST): UTC+2 (CEST)
- Postal code: 14100
- Dialing code: 0141
- Patron saint: Saint Secundus of Asti
- Saint day: First Tuesday of May
- Website: www.comune.asti.it

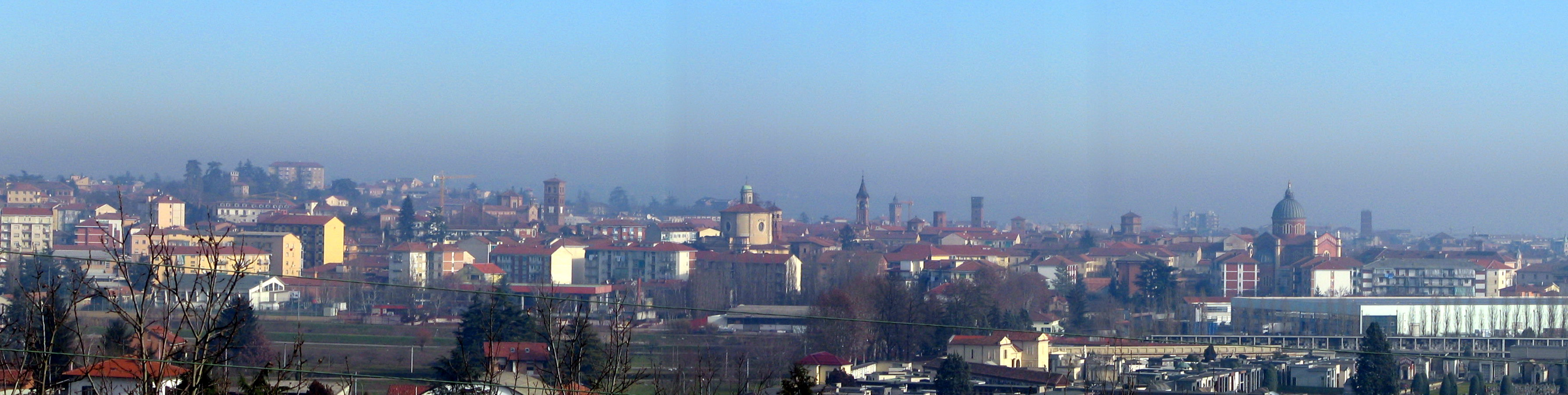
Panoramic view of Asti

Asti (UK: /ˈæsti/ AST-ee, US: /ˈɑːsti/ AH-stee; Italian: [ˈasti]; Piedmontese: Ast [ˈɑst]) is a comune (municipality) of 74,348 inhabitants (1–1–2021) located in the Italian region of Piedmont, about 55 kilometres (34 miles) east of Turin, in the plain of the Tanaro River. It is the capital of the province of Asti and it is deemed to be the modern capital of Montferrat.

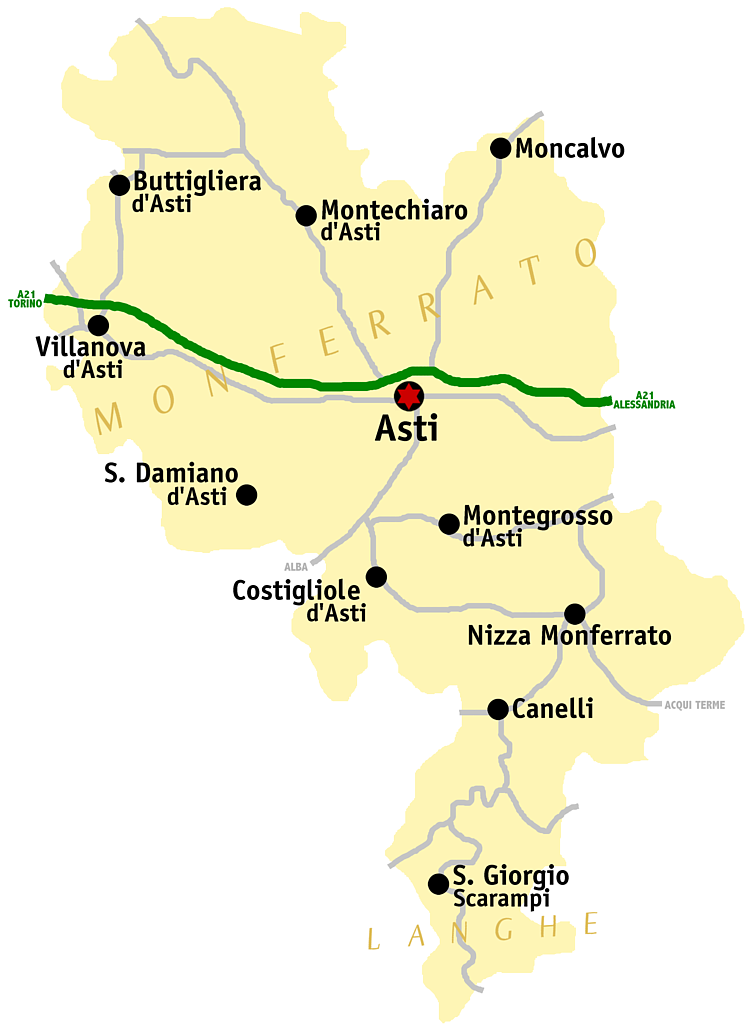
Location of Asti within its province

== History ==
=== Ancient times and early Middle Ages ===
People have lived in and around what is now Asti since the Neolithic period. Before their defeat in 174 BC by the Romans, tribes of Ligures, the Statielli, dominated the area and the toponym probably derives from Ast which means "hill" in the ancient Celtic language.

In 124 BC the Romans built a castrum, or fortified camp, which eventually evolved into a full city named Hasta. In 89 BC the city received the status of colonia, and in 49 BC that of municipium. Asti became an important city of the Augustan Regio IX, favoured by its strategic position on the Tanaro river and on the Via Fulvia, which linked Derthona (Tortona) to Augusta Taurinorum (Turin). Other roads connected the city to the main passes for what are today Switzerland and France.

The city was crucial during the early stages of the barbarian invasions which stormed Italy during the fall of the Western Roman Empire. In early 402 AD, the Visigoths had invaded northern Italy and were advancing on Mediolanum (modern Milan) which was the imperial capital at that time. Honorius, the young emperor and a resident in that city, unable to wait for promised reinforcements any longer, was compelled to flee from Milan for safety in the city of Arles in Gaul. However, just after his convoy had left Milan and crossed the River Po his escape route through the Alps was cut off by the Gothic cavalry. This forced him to take emergency refuge in the city of Hasta until more Roman troops could be assembled in Italy. The Goths placed Hasta under siege until March when General Stilicho, bringing reinforcements from the Rhine, fought and defeated them at the Battle of Pollentia. After this first victorious defence, thanks to a massive line of walls, Hasta suffered from the barbarian invasions which stormed Italy after the fall of the Western Empire, and declined economically.

In the second half of the 6th century, it was chosen as a seat for one of the 36 Duchies in which the Lombards divided Italy. The territory of Asti comprised a wide area, stretching out to Albenga and the Maritime Alps. This remained when northern Italy was conquered by the Franks in 774, with the title of County.

In the late Carolingian age, Asti was ruled directly by his bishops, who were the main landlords of the area. Most important are Audax (904-926) and Bruningus (937-966), who moved the episcopal seat to the Castel Vecchio ("Old Castle"), where it remained until 1409. The bishopric of Asti remained a powerful entity well into the 11th century when Pietro II received huge privileges by emperor Henry II. In the second half of the century, Bishop Otto tried to resist the aims of the powerful countess Adelaide of Susa, who damaged the city several times. During Otto's reign, a commune and the consul magistrates are mentioned for the first time (1095).

=== Local power ===
Asti was one of the first free communes of Italy, and in 1140 received the right to mint coins of its own by Conrad II. As the commune, however, had begun to erode the lands of the bishop and other local feudatories, the latter sued for help to Frederick Barbarossa, who presented under the city walls with a huge army in February 1155. After a short siege, Asti was stormed and burnt. Subsequently, Asti adhered to the Lombard League (1169) against the German emperor, but was again defeated in 1174. Despite this, after the Peace of Constance (1183), the city gained further privileges.

The 13th century saw the peak of the Astigiani economic and cultural splendour, only momentarily hindered by wars against Alba, Alessandria, Savoy, Milan (which besieged the city in 1230) and the Marquesses of Montferrat and Saluzzo. In particular, the commune aimed to gain control over the lucrative trade routes leading northwards from the Ligurian ports. In this period, the rise of the Casane Astigiane resulted in contrasting political familial alliances of Guelph and Ghibelline supporters. During the wars led by Emperor Frederick II in northern Italy, the city chose his side: Asti was defeated by the Guelphs of Alessandria at Quattordio and Clamandrana, but thanks to Genoese help, it recovered easily. After Frederick's death, the struggle against Thomas II of Savoy became fierce: the Astigiani defeated him on 23 February 1255, at the Battle of Montebruno, but Thomas (who had been taken prisoner) replied ordering all traders from Asti to be arrested in Savoy and France. This move showed worry on the part of Asti's neighbouring states over the excessive power gained by the city, which had captured Alba and controlled both Chieri and Turin.

This state of affairs led to the intervention of Charles I of Anjou, then King of Naples and the most powerful man in Italy. After some guerrilla actions, Asti signed a pact of alliance with Pavia, Genoa and William VII of Montferrat. In 1274 the Astigiani troops were defeated at the Battle of Cassano, but, on 12 December 1275, were victorious over the Angevins at the Battle of Roccavione, ending Charles' attempt to expand in Piedmont. In the 1290s, after William VII had also been defeated, Asti was the most powerful city in Piedmont. However, internal struggles for the control of trading and banking enterprises soon divided the city into factions. The most prominent faction was the powerful bankers of the Solari family, who, in 1314, gave the city to king Robert of Naples.

In 1339, Ghibelline exiles recaptured the city, expelling the Solari and their Neopolitan allies. Shortly thereafter in 1340, Luchino Visconti, Lord of Milan took control of Asti, an act which the rulers of the commune formally accepted in 1342 to protect against the potential of a Solari counteroffensive. To protect the new burgs of the city, Visconti built a citadel and a second ring of walls. In 1345, at the Battle of Gamenario, the Ghibelline Astigiani and John II of Montferrat defeated the Neapolitans in a clash between Guelph forces from the Kingdom of Naples and the Ghibellines supported by the Lombard communes. After the Battle of Gamenario, John II expanded the territory of Montferrat and ultimately in 1356 took Asti from the Visconti ending 16 years of control by Milan. John ruled over Asti until 1372, but seven years later the city council submitted to Galeazzo II Visconti's authority. Later in 1389, when Galeazzo's daughter Valentina Visconti married Louis of Valois, Duke of Orléans, Asti would be included as part of her dowry.

=== French and Savoyard domination ===
With the exception of several brief periods under Visconti, Montferrat and Sforza rule, Asti remained under Valois control; it eventually became a direct subject of the French Crown. The situation changed in the early 16th century, during the wars between Charles V and Francis I of France. In 1526 it was besieged in vain by Charles' condottiero Fabrizio Maramaldo. Three years later, Asti was conveyed as a result of the Treaty of Cambrai to the Holy Roman Empire by which it was ruled until 1531 when Emperor Charles V gave the territory as a fiefdom to his cousin Beatrice of Portugal, Duchess of Savoy. Later at the time of Beatrice's death in 1538, Asti was inherited by her son and included on the Savoys' heritage.

Asti was one of the main Savoyard strongholds in later wars. In 1616, besieged by the Spanish governor of Milan, it was defended by Duke Charles Emmanuel I himself. In 1630–31, the city suffered a high mortality rate from an outbreak of the plague. Some years later Asti was conquered by the Spanish, although Savoy regained the city in 1643. Another unsuccessful Spanish siege occurred in 1650. In November 1703, during the War of Spanish Succession, Asti fell to France again; it was reconquered in 1705 by Victor Amadeus II. In 1745 French troops invaded the city once more, but it was liberated the following year.

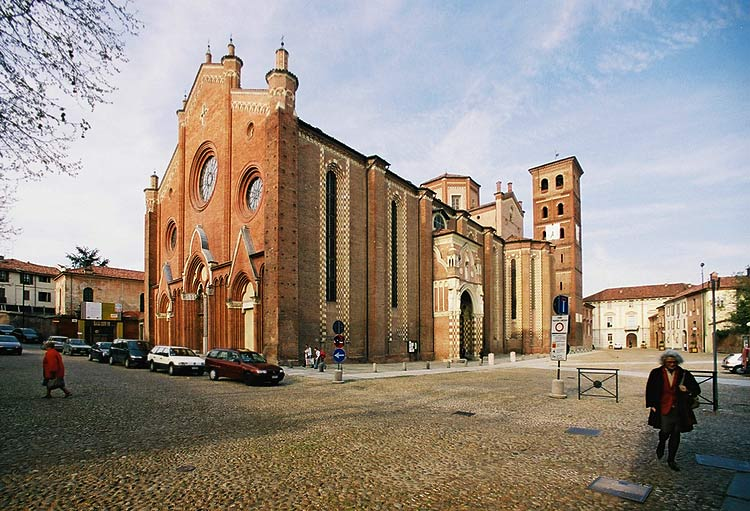
The cathedral of Asti

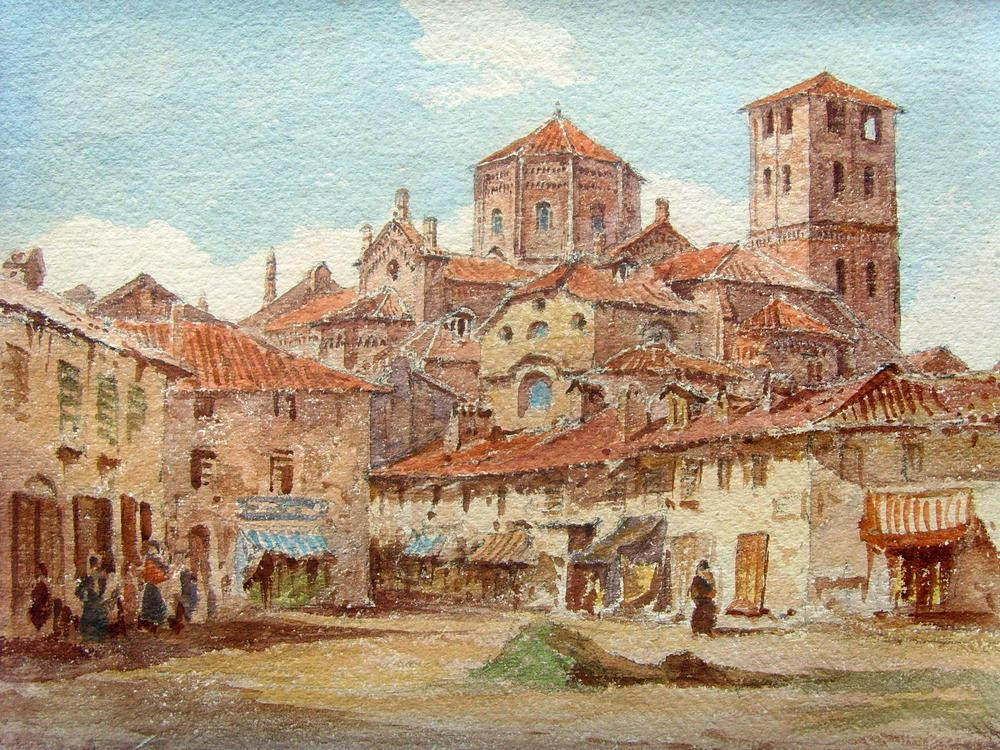
View of Asti and the Collegiata di San Secondo – Antonio Bignoli 1857.

In 1797 the Astigiani, enraged by the continuous military campaigns and by their resulting poor economic situation, revolted against the Savoyard government. On July 28 the Repubblica Astese was declared. However, it was suppressed only two days later. The revolutionary chiefs were arrested and executed. The following year the Savoyards were expelled from Piedmont by the French revolutionary army, and Asti was occupied by general Montrichard. After a short reversal, the French returned after the victory at Marengo (1800) near to Alessandra. Napoleon himself visited Asti on 29 April 1805, but was received rather coldly by the citizens. The city was demoted and incorporated with Alessandra under the department of Marengo. After the end of the French empire, Asti returned to Piedmont in 1814; the city followed Piedmontese history until the unification of Italy in 1861.

=== Modern era ===
In 1935, Asti became a provincial capital, separating its territory from the Province of Alessandria.

During the Second World War, following the Armistice of Cassibile on 8 September 1943, the establishment of the Italian Social Republic (the Republic of Salò) and the German occupation, Asti and the Monferrato region experienced the full impact of the resistance movement. This included the establishment of one of the partisan republics, the Republic of Upper Monferrato, which existed from September to December 1944, Anglo-American bombing raids, the persecution of Jews, roundups and deportations.

On 4 September 1948, the city suffered severe damage and casualties due to flooding caused by heavy rainstorms. Several streams, including the Borbore and Tinella, as well as the Tanaro River, overflowed their banks.

On 6 November 1994, the city was struck by another flood, caused by the Tanaro River overflowing its banks.

On 21 June 2012, Asti was hit by a brief but extremely intense thunderstorm (classified as a supercell by meteorologists). Fortunately, it did not cause damage on the scale of the 1994 flood, but it did cause localized flooding in areas such as Piazza Marconi, Via Cavour, Corso Alfieri and Piazza del Palio. Agricultural damage was estimated at millions of euros, with the municipality suffering losses of a similar magnitude due to uprooted trees and roads blocked by the numerous debris carried by the strong winds.

== Geography ==
=== Climate ===
Asti has a continental climate which is moderated by the proximity of the Mediterranean sea: its winters are warmer, and its summers cooler than Turin. Rain falls mostly during the spring and autumn; during the hottest months, rain is less common, but stronger when it does occur, usually in thunderstorms. During November and December in particular, the town of Asti can be prone to fog, which is less common in the higher-altitude areas that surround it. According to the Köppen climate classification, Asti has a humid subtropical climate (Cfa).

Climate data for Asti (1998–2020)
Month	Jan	Feb	Mar	Apr	May	Jun	Jul	Aug	Sep	Oct	Nov	Dec	Year
Mean daily maximum °C (°F)	6.8 (44.2)	9.8 (49.6)	15.1 (59.2)	19.0 (66.2)	23.3 (73.9)	28.2 (82.8)	30.7 (87.3)	30.1 (86.2)	25.1 (77.2)	18.6 (65.5)	11.9 (53.4)	7.1 (44.8)	18.8 (65.9)
Daily mean °C (°F)	2.4 (36.3)	4.4 (39.9)	9.0 (48.2)	13.1 (55.6)	17.4 (63.3)	22.1 (71.8)	24.2 (75.6)	23.8 (74.8)	19.2 (66.6)	13.7 (56.7)	7.8 (46.0)	3.0 (37.4)	13.3 (56.0)
Mean daily minimum °C (°F)	−1.9 (28.6)	−0.9 (30.4)	2.8 (37.0)	7.2 (45.0)	11.6 (52.9)	15.9 (60.6)	17.8 (64.0)	17.6 (63.7)	13.3 (55.9)	8.8 (47.8)	3.8 (38.8)	−1.0 (30.2)	7.9 (46.2)
Average precipitation mm (inches)	42 (1.7)	49 (1.9)	55 (2.2)	70 (2.8)	87 (3.4)	42 (1.7)	43 (1.7)	48 (1.9)	56 (2.2)	66 (2.6)	98 (3.9)	52 (2.0)	708 (28)
Average precipitation days	5	5	5	7	8	5	4	4	5	6	8	6	68
Source: Climi e viaggi

== Demographics ==
Historical population

Year	Pop.	±%
1861	34,083	—
1871	36,917	+8.3%
1881	38,215	+3.5%
1901	44,533	+16.5%
1911	46,361	+4.1%
1921	45,810	−1.2%
1931	48,714	+6.3%
1936	48,898	+0.4%

Year	Pop.	±%
1951	52,000	+6.3%
1961	61,044	+17.4%
1971	76,151	+24.7%
1981	77,681	+2.0%
1991	73,557	−5.3%
2001	71,276	−3.1%
2011	73,899	+3.7%
2021	73,723	−0.2%

Source: ISTAT

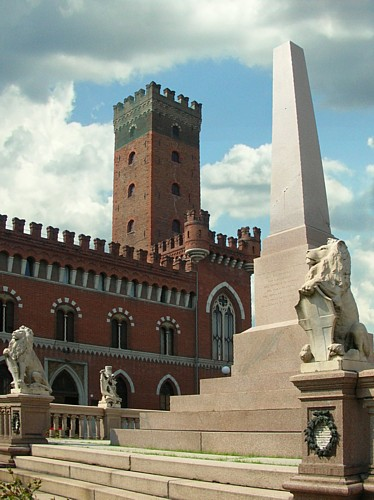
Piazza Roma.

== Main sights ==
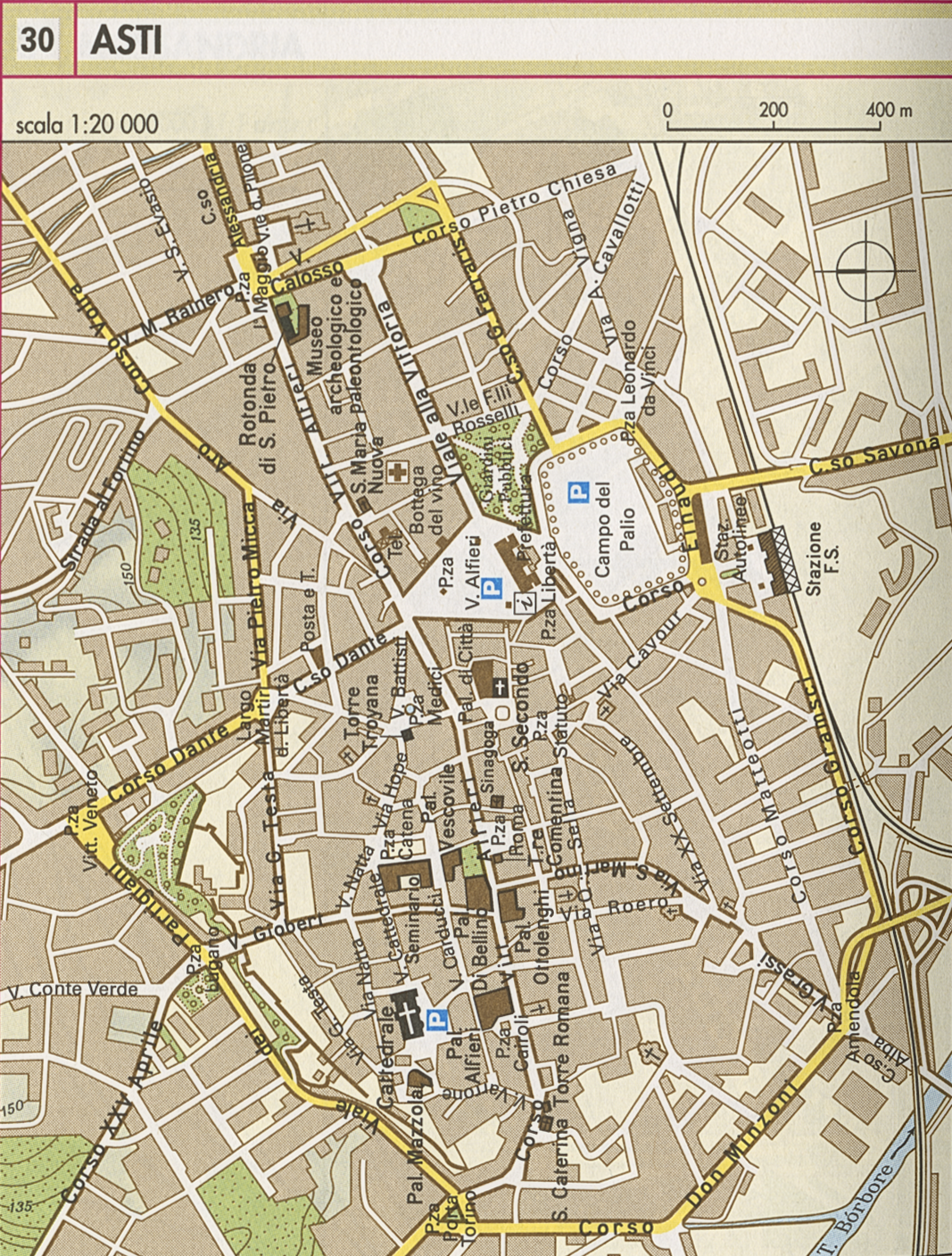
Map of city centre

Sections of the ancient city walls remain on the north side of the city and in the late 20th century building work uncovered a section of Roman wall in the center of the city.

The area to the northwest of the city, between the centre and the cathedral, is rich in medieval palaces and merchants' houses, many with monumental towers. Asti was known as the city of 100 towers (although there were 120 in total) of which several still remain, among them, the Tower of the Comentini (13th century), the octagonal Torre de Regibus and Torre Troyana (13th century), as well as the ancient Torre Rossa, built during the reign of the Roman Emperor Augustus.

Asti is home to several old churches. These include:

- Cathedral of Santa Maria Assunta (built in the 13th century over another Cathedral), one of the biggest in Piedmont, in Romanesque-Gothic style. The monument belfry is from 1266. the façade is characterized by three portals, each surmounted by a big rose window. The interior, with a nave and two aisles, houses a cycle of 18th-century frescoes, some altarpieces by Gandolfino d'Asti and precious silver artworks from the 15th-16th centuries. The presbytery has a noteworthy mosaic floor, from the pre-existing church. Next to the last pilasters of the nave are two 14th-century artworks, the funerary seal of bishop Baldracco Malabaila and the equestrian portrait of Arricino Moneta.
- Collegiata di San Secondo (13th century) in the old medieval centre next to the Palazzo Civico. It is dedicated to the city's patron saint, Secundus of Asti. The crypt is from the 6th century. The façade has three notable Gothic portals, while the interior houses a polyptych by Gandolfino d'Asti and other works.
- Santa Maria Nuova (11th century).
- San Martino, First mentioned in 886, the old Gothic edifice was dismantled in 1696 and rebuilt along Baroque lines in 1736.
- Sant'Anastasio (8th-12th century), whose museum has some antique capitals and sculptures.
- Santa Caterina Baroque church
- Baptistery of San Pietro(12th century) building from the High Middle Ages in the city. It has an octagonal plan with a wide dome.
- San Pietro in Consavia (15th century), with elegant external decorations. It is the seat of the Archaeological Museum, with Roman and Egyptian works.

There is a synagogue and a museum depicting the history of Asti's Jewish community, whose presence is documented since 812.

== Events ==
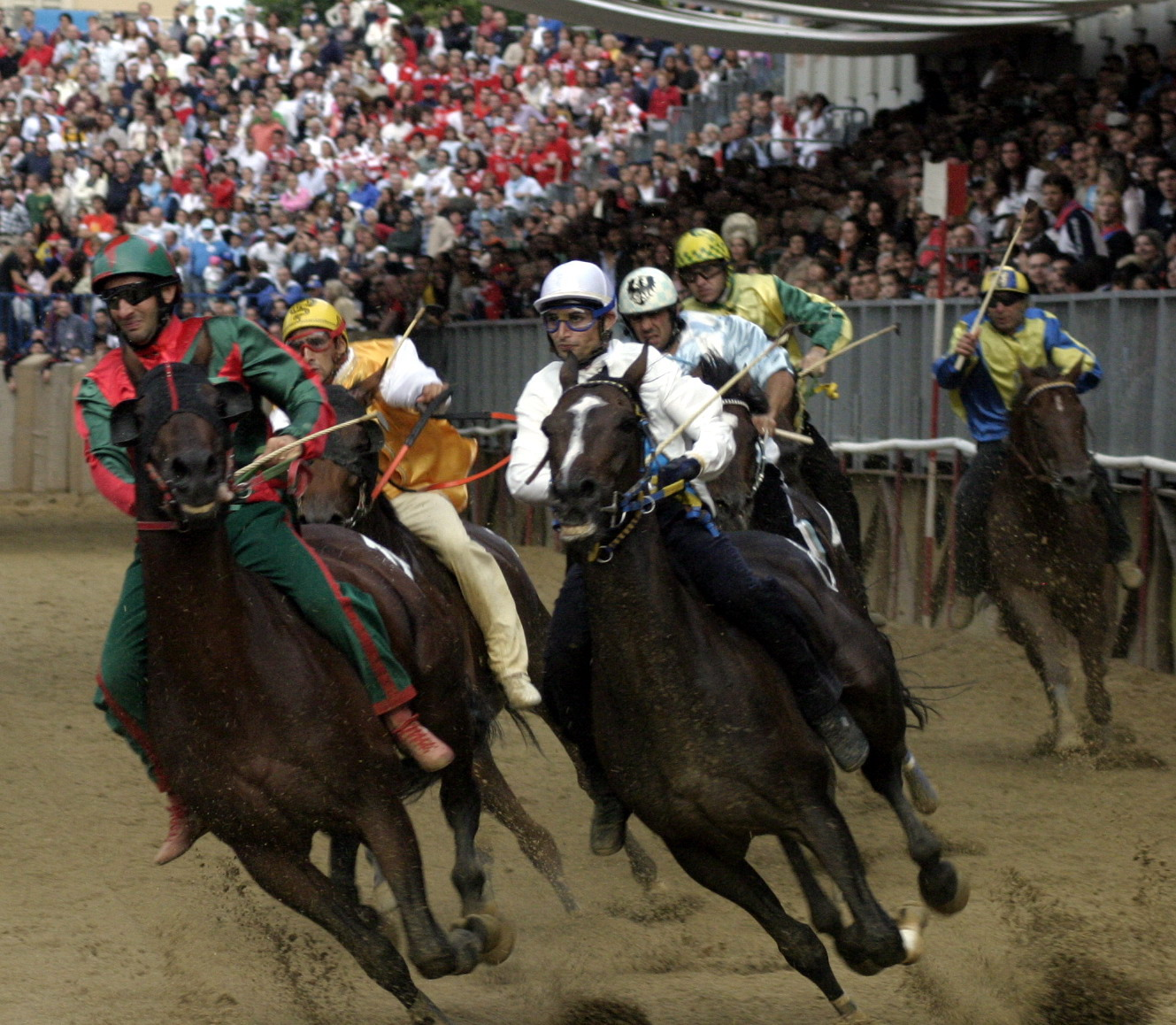
Palio di Asti.

One of the most famous events held in Asti is the famous Palio di Asti, in which all the old town wards, called "Rioni" and "Borghi", plus nearby towns compete in a bareback horse race. This event recalls a victory in battle against the rival city Alba, during the Middle Ages. After the victorious battle, a race was held around Alba's walls, and from then on, every year in Asti. Asti's Palio is the oldest recorded one in Italy, and in modern times is held in the triangular Piazza Alfieri, preceded by a medieval pageant through the old town on the 3rd Sunday of September.

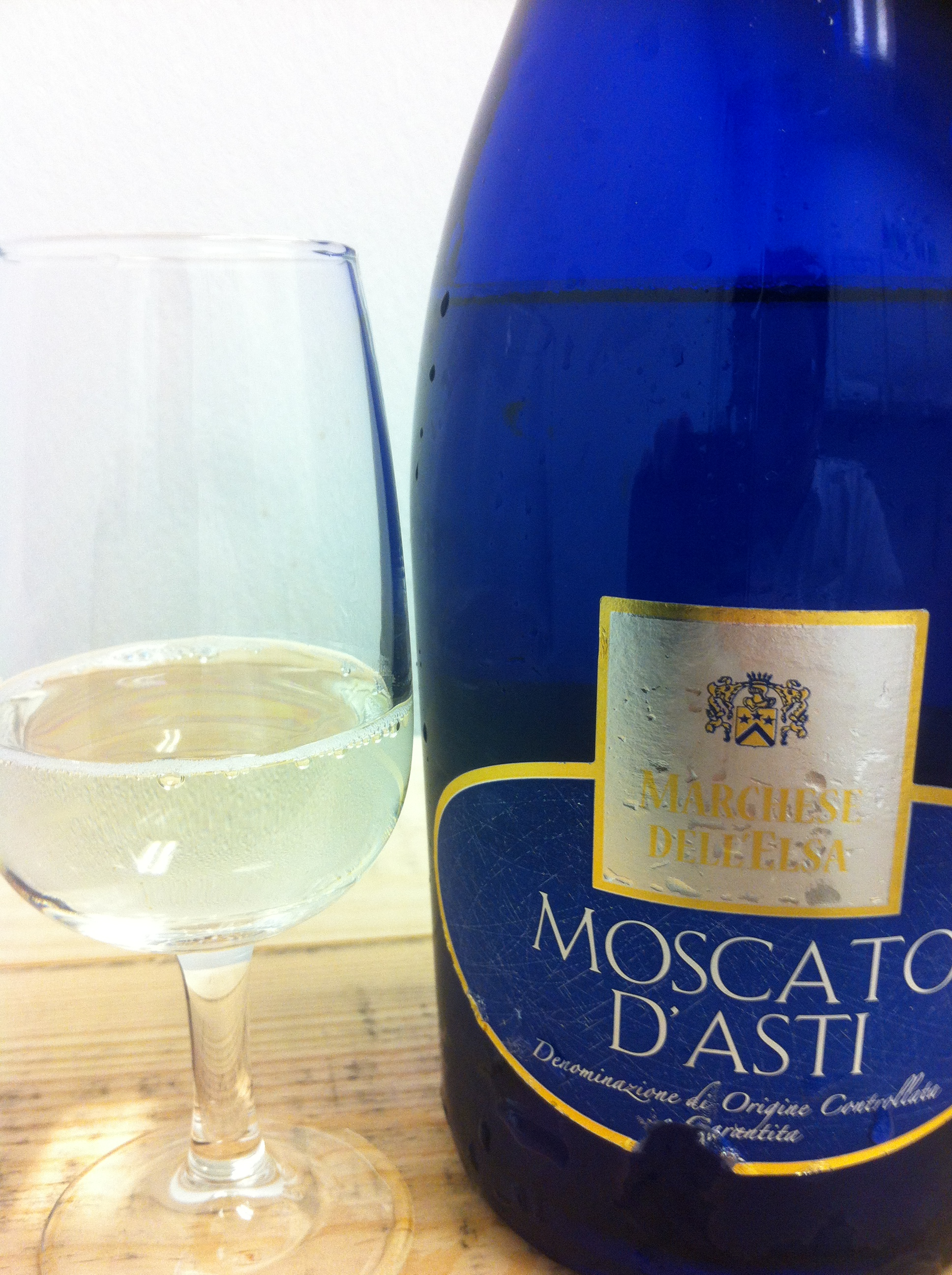
A Moscato d'Asti.

== Wine ==
The three neighbouring Provinces of Asti, Cuneo, and Alessandria incorporate the Langhe and Monferrato Hills region in the centre of Piedmont, limestone and sandstone deposits laid down by the retreating Adriatic some 5 million years ago, and are home to some of Italy's most known red wines, plus some white ones.

Asti is the centre of production of the sparkling Asti (DOCG, often known as Asti Spumante). Asti is typically sweet and low in alcohol (often below 8%). It is made solely from the moscato bianco white muscat grape. Other wines include a premium version known as Moscato d'Asti (DOCG) and the red Barbera.

The first products from the province of Asti to become known internationally are Martini and Rossi, Gancia, and Riccadonna, which made commercial wines like Asti Spumante; red wines such as Barbera d'Asti, Freisa d'Asti, Grignolino d'Asti, Bonarda, Grignolino and Ruché di Castagnole Monferrato are also becoming widespread worldwide. These wines and many others can be sampled during the week-long Douja d'Or wine exhibition, which is held at the same time as the Palio and Sagre.

The first documentation on the variety Freisa d'Asti is from the beginning of the 16th century.

== Food ==
Asti is also famous for its Asti's Festival of Festivals, held in September, a week before the Palio. During the festival, most of the towns in Asti province meet in a great square called "Campo del Palio", where they offer typical food and wine for which they are known. On the Sunday of the Sagre, all the towns involved stage a parade with floats depicting traditional farming with everyone in costume along Asti's roads to reach "Campo del Palio" square.

From October to December its white truffle or "tartufo bianco" season. Although neighbouring Alba is better known for its October truffle fair, truffles are also found around Asti's hills, and every weekend there is a local truffle festival.

== Sport ==
The main football club of the town was Asti Calcio F.C. (ex-A.C.D. Asti), which folded in 2017. Another football club, A.S.D. Colline Alfieri Don Bosco (ex-A.C. Celle, from Celle Enomondo), relocated to the city and was renamed to "A.S.D. Alfieri Asti" in 2017. Since 2019, it has been known as A.S.D. Asti.

Former futsal league champion, A.S.D. Asti Calcio a 5, is also based in Asti.

== Transport ==
Asti railway station, opened in 1849, forms part of the Turin–Genoa and Castagnole–Asti–Mortara railways. It is also a junction for two other lines, to Genoa and Chivasso, respectively.

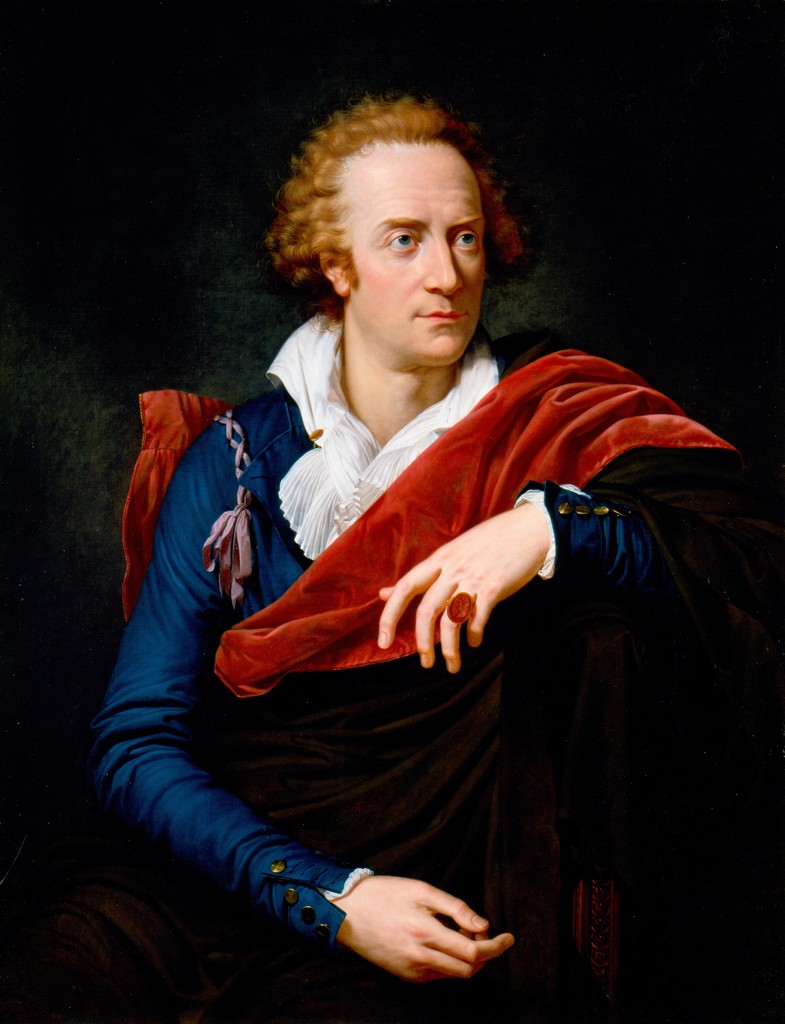
Vittorio Alfieri

== People ==
People from Asti include:

- Gandolfino d'Asti, or Gandolfino da Roreto (active 1493–1518) Renaissance painter
- Vittorio Alfieri (1749–1803), a dramatist who has been described as the "founder of Italian tragedy"
- Isaac Artom (1829 –1900), writer, diplomat, and politician
- Michelangelo Pittatore (1825–1903), portrait painter
- Umberto Cagni (1863–1932), polar explorer and admiral
- Carlo Alberto Castigliano (1847–1884), mathematician and physicist
- Mikhail Tsvet (Михаил Семёнович Цвет, also spelt Tsvett, Tswett, Tswet, Zwet, and Cvet; 1872–1919) Russian-Italian botanist and inventor of chromatography
- Ettore Desderi (1892–1974), composer best known for his sacred music
- Paolo Conte (born 1937), painter, poet and songwriter
- Giovanni Goria (1943–1994), Christian Democratic politician, prime minister of Italy from 1987 until 1988
- Giorgio Faletti (1950–2014), writer, actor and singer-songwriter
- Maurizio Lobina (born 1973), dance musician and member of the worldwide famous dance music band Eiffel 65, and ex-member of Bloom 06
- Matteo Paro (born 1983), footballer
- Rinaldo Capello (born 1964), driver, three-time winner of 24 Hours of Le Mans
- Fabio Mengozzi (born 1980), pianist and composer

== Frazioni ==
The Asti comune consists of the following frazioni:

Casabianca, Castiglione, Mombarone, Montegrosso, Montemarzo, Poggio D'Asti, Quarto D'Asti, Revignano, San Marzanotto, Serravalle, Sessant, Stazione Di Portacomaro, Vaglierano, Valgera, Valleandona, Valletanaro, Variglie, Viatosto, Avidano, Baciglio, Balestrino, Barbantana, Belangero, Beneficio-Stangona, Biamini, Bramairate, Bricchetto, Bricco Modena, Briccolino, Burie, Cà Dei Coppi, Carretti, Cascin Ruasin, Cascina Angelo, Cascina Conti, Cascina Fanfarina, Cascina Fontana, Cascina Gioia, Cascina Stella, Cascine Artiglione, Cascine Roasio, Ceresa, Cravera, Distretto, Fornaca, Ghirlandina, Gianotti, Giberto, Lama-Garoppa, Madonna Di Caniglie, Madonna Di Viatosto, Malandroni, Manina, Manzoni, Matei, Meridiana, Olivero, Palucco, Quaranta, Quarto, Roccaschiavino, Rocche Di Callianetto, Rossi, San Giuseppe, San Grato, San Marzanotto Piana, San Sebastiano, Stazione Di Sessant, Torrazzo, Vaglierano Basso, Vairo, Valcossana-Grilletto, Valenzani, Valfea, Valmairone, Vareglio.

== International relations ==
Asti is twinned with:

- Valence, France, since 1966
- Biberach an der Riß, Germany
- Ma'alot-Tarshiha, Israel
- Nanyang, Henan, China, since 2023

== See also ==
- Biblioteca Astense
- Roman Catholic Diocese of Asti
- Towers and palaces of the Roero
