= Torre Troyana =

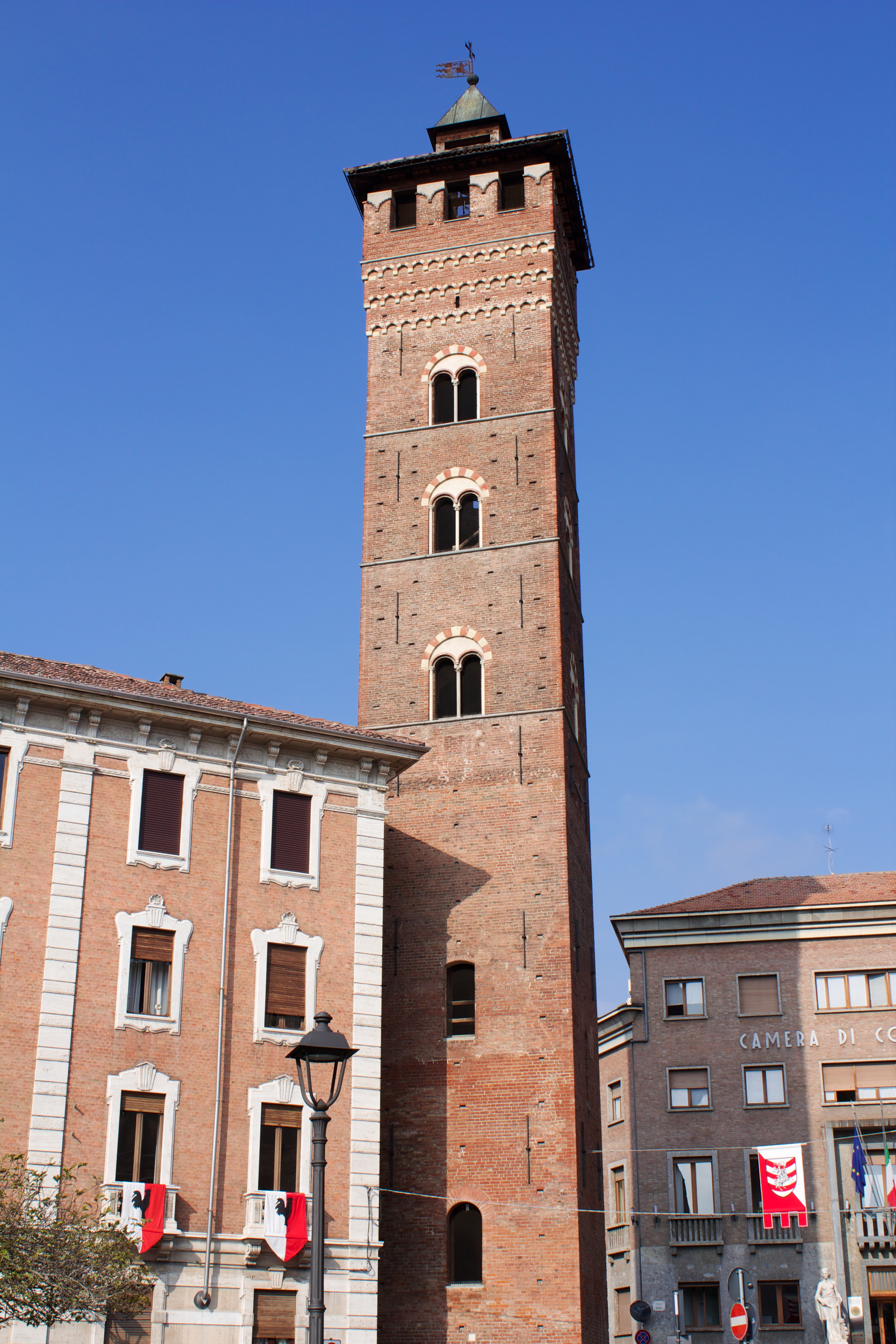

General information
- Type: Campanile
- Town or city: Asti
- Country: Italy
- Coordinates: 44.900887°N 8.204122°E
- Groundbreaking: Late 12th century
- Completed: 1260–1280
- Height: 44 metres (144 ft)

The Torre Troyana ("Troyan Tower", after the family Troya that built it) is a tower in Asti, Italy, and one of the main symbols of the city.

It is a campanile, or freestanding bell tower, and in the 19th century it was used to signal hours during daylight.

== Building ==
It is 44 metres high and is square in plan with 5.90-metre sides. It ends with Ghibelline merlons surmounted by a metal pinnacle which covers a clock.

== History ==
The basement was built in late 12th century. The original client is unknown, but the construction remained incomplete. In the first half of the 13th century, the powerful family of bankers Troja (later Troya) bought the unfinished tower and resumed the building; the tower was then finished somewhere between 1260 and 1280. In the Middle Ages it was a common practice for powerful and rich families to build a tall tower to show off their wealth: during the history there have been about 120 towers in Asti, of which several still remain.

Following the decline of Troja family, in the second half of 14th century the tower was annexed to the nearby building, which was the seat of the government of the city, headed by the Dukes of Orléans. Later in 1422 Filippo Maria Visconti moved the seat of government to another building and the former one was assigned to the use of the town council. A clock was then placed in the tower and in 1470 the roof and the steeple were added. The seat of the city council was later moved again, but the tower kept its public function. In 1560, Emmanuel Philibert, Duke of Savoy finally donated the tower to the city council.

The tower was restored in 1905.

== Bell ==
A bell was first placed in the tower in early 15th century, but the current one dates back to the 16th century and is the second most ancient bell in Piedmont and the most ancient that still marks the hours, the older one being preserved in a museum.

According to some old annals, the bell was created in 1531. It has a diameter and a height of 120 centimetres (47 in), weighs 1.4 tonnes (220 st) and its intonation is in the note of E.

An inscription in Latin is present, which gives information about the origin of the bell:

TEMPORA HORIS OLIM DESIGNANS OB BELLUM IN MACHINAM VERSAM NUNC AD OPUS MEUM RESTITUOR. MCCCCCXXXI.

Once I signified hours. Because of the war I was transformed into a machine. Now I am restored to my original duty. 1531.

In the Middle Ages it was a common practice to use bells as a source of iron to forge cannons in wartime, when it was necessary to quicken their production. The inscription states that the iron of a cannon was used to forge the bell instead, probably after the war ended.

== See also ==
- Casane Astigiane
