= Theatrum Statuum Sabaudiae =

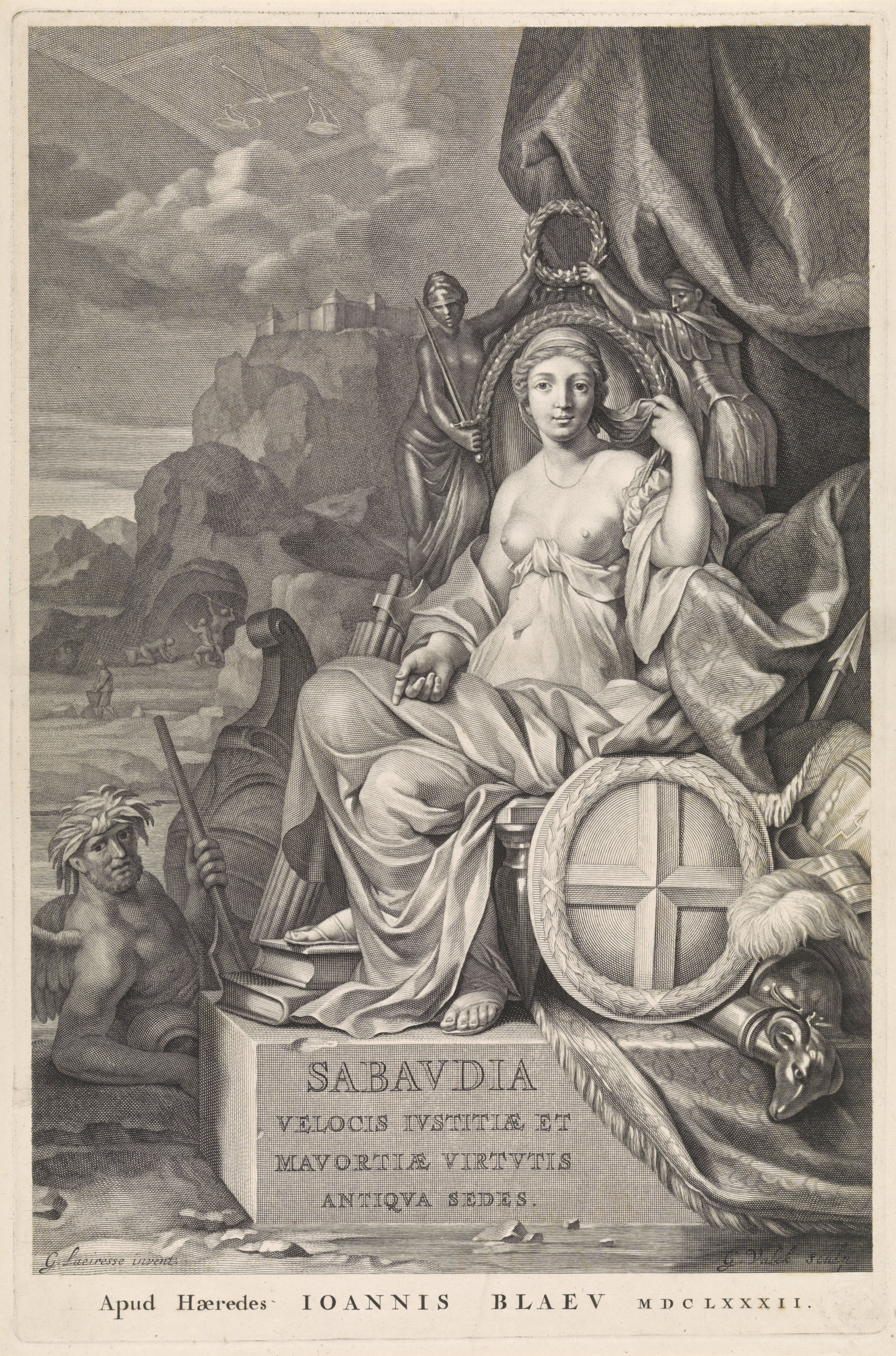
- Title page of Theatrum Statuum Sabaudiae
- Language: Latin language
- Genre: Atlas
- Publisher: Joan Blaeu
- Publication place: Amsterdam
- Media type: 2 volume series of books

The Theatrum Statuum Regiae Celsitudinis Sabaudiae Ducis, Pedemontii Principis, Cypri Regis – also known as Theatrum Statuum Sabaudiae and commonly abbreviated to Theatrum Sabaudiae – is an iconographic and cartographic depiction of the territories belonging to the House of Savoy. Produced during the second half of the 17th century under the patronage of Charles Emmanuel II, it was printed by the heirs of the Dutch cartographer and publisher Joan Blaeu in Amsterdam in 1682.

== History ==
The Theatrum Sabaudiae is considered a political manifesto, intended to showcase the wealth and power of the Duchy of Savoy to the rest of Europe. According to Andrew Moore, "the Theatrum successfully acted as a political statement that challenged the court of Versailles, demonstrating the extent of the wealth and territories of the Alpine principality, helping to overturn the notion of the Alps as geographically isolated". The project began to take shape in the mid-17th century. In 1657, the prominent Dutch cartographer Joan Blaeu approached the Turin court to obtain official topographies of Savoyard cities to expand his acclaimed regional atlas collections. Recognising the power of cartography as a tool for political prestige, the Duchess Regent, Christine of France (wife of Victor Amadeus I and daughter of King Henry IV), commissioned a series of highly detailed topographical maps and views of the principal cities of the Duchy. The project was continued and expanded by her son, Charles Emmanuel II, in 1661.

The work was almost completed when on the night of 23 February 1672 a disastrous fire destroyed the Blaeu printing workshop. The duke of Savoy was forced to finance the re-engraving and the repair of the plates destroyed or damaged during the fire, but he died before seeing the work accomplished. Blaeu did not survive the sorrow caused by the destruction of the greatest part of his fortune, and he died the following year. It took nine years, during which Blaeu's sons continued their father's activity and Piedmontese officials reintegrated drawings and information. The work was finally delivered to the Duchess Regent Marie Jeanne Baptiste of Savoy-Nemours in 1682. The complete work cost the House of Savoy nearly 30.000 golden florins, which were paid in several instalments.

== Description ==
The Theatrum Statuum Sabaudiae provides an overview and description of the territories under the rule of the House of Savoy (the 'States of Savoy') during the 17th century through maps and engravings, covering their history, geography, economy, culture, society and religion. The work consists of two large folio volumes of engraved maps and city views, accompanied by a commentary in Latin. An initial print run of 50 copies was produced. Four of these were hand-coloured and intended for the Prince and members of the House of Savoy. The remaining 46 copies were distributed to promote the grandeur of the House of Savoy among foreign diplomatic circles. Dutch editions of the atlas were published in 1693, 1697 and 1725. French editions appeared in 1700 and 1725, and a second Latin edition was published in 1726.

The Theatrum Sabaudiae comprises 145 annotated bird's-eye views. The original drawings were created by a team of military engineers led by the court cartographer Giovanni Tommaso Borgonio and including Giovenale Boetto. The drawings were then etched in Amsterdam by a group of Dutch engravers including Ambrosius Perlingh and Romeyn de Hooghe. The accompanying texts were written by the Jesuit polymath Emanuele Tesauro and the historian Pierre Gioffredo (1629–1692).

The first volume of the atlas contains maps of Piedmont and Turin and images of the region's major civil, religious and military buildings. The second volume covers Savoy and other areas under the rule of the House of Savoy, including the March of Montferrat and territories to the west of the Alps.

== Gallery ==
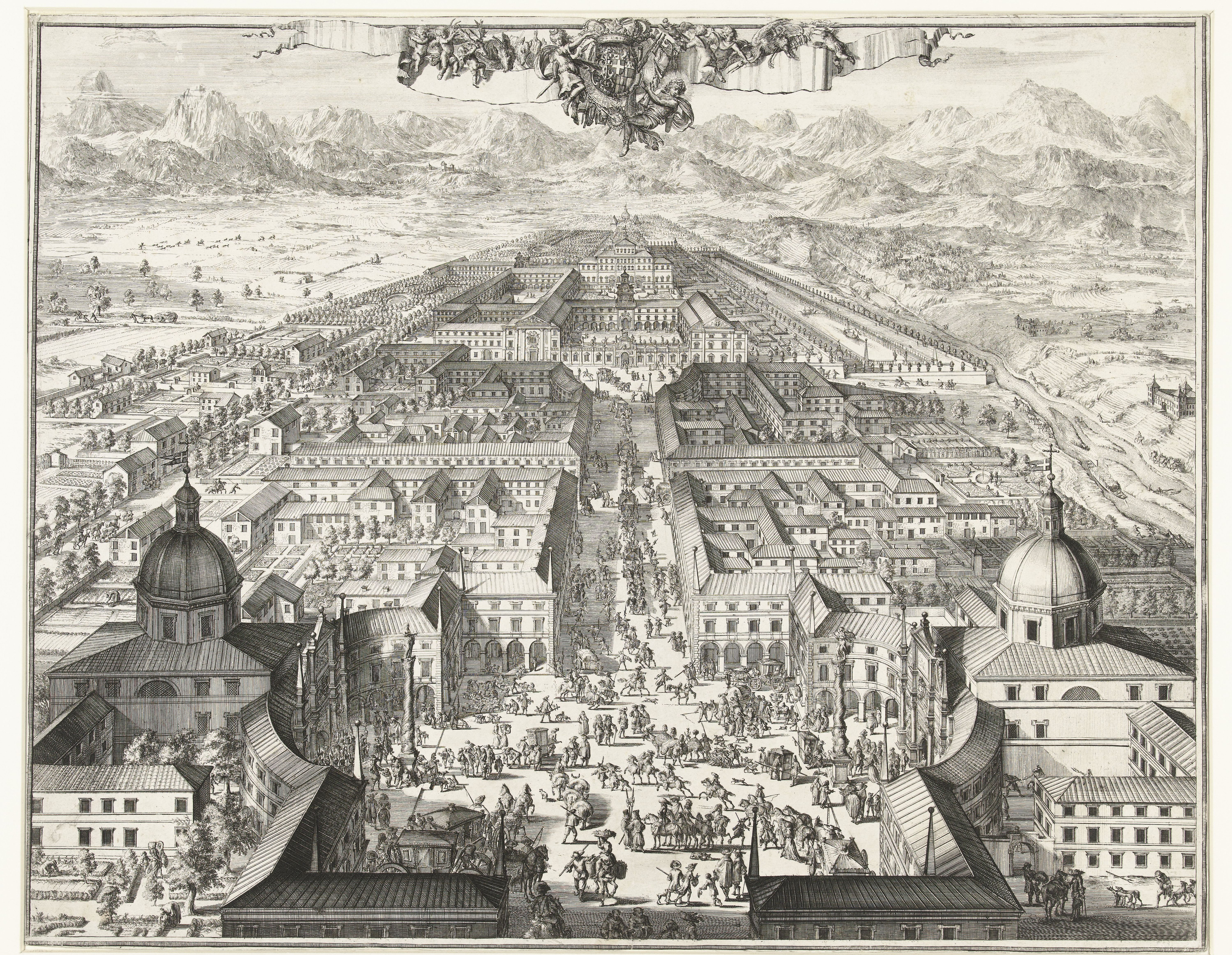
The Palace of Venaria

The Fanum Dianae in the Palace of Venaria

View of Turin

Piazza Castello, Turin

Palazzo di Città, Turin

Manta, Piedmont

Rivoli

Nice

== Bibliography ==
- Tamburini, Luciano (1970). "BORGONIO, Giovanni Tomaso". Dizionario Biografico degli Italiani (in Italian). Vol. 12: Bonfadini–Borrello. Rome: Institute of the Italian Encyclopaedia. ISBN 978-88-12-00032-6.
- Oresko, Robert (1997). "The House of Savoy in Search for a Royal Crown in the Seventeenth Century". In R. Oresko; G.C. Gibbs; H.M. Scott (eds.). Royal and Republican Sovereignty in Early Modern Europe: Essays in Memory of Ragnhild Hatton. Cambridge: Cambridge University Press. pp. 272–350. ISBN 978-0521419109.
- Weigel, Anne. "Dossier « Le Theatrum Sabaudiæ »". www.sabaudia.org. Archived from the original on 16 March 2016.
- Bourdon, Étienne (2009). "Les relations entre voyage, construction du savoir et connaissance des territoires à travers l'œuvre de Giovanni Tomaso Borgonio". Rives méditerranéennes (in French). 34: 27–43. doi:10.4000/rives.3806.
- Moore, Andrew (2017). "Thomas Coke in Turin and the Turin Royal Academy". In P. Bianchi; K. Wolfe; H.M. Scott (eds.). Turin and the British in the Age of the Grand Tour. Cambridge: Cambridge University Press. pp. 108–127. ISBN 9781107147706.
