= Red Tower (Pärnu) =

Tower in Pärnu, Estonia

- Part of Pärnu Castle
- Pärnu, Pärnu County, Estonia
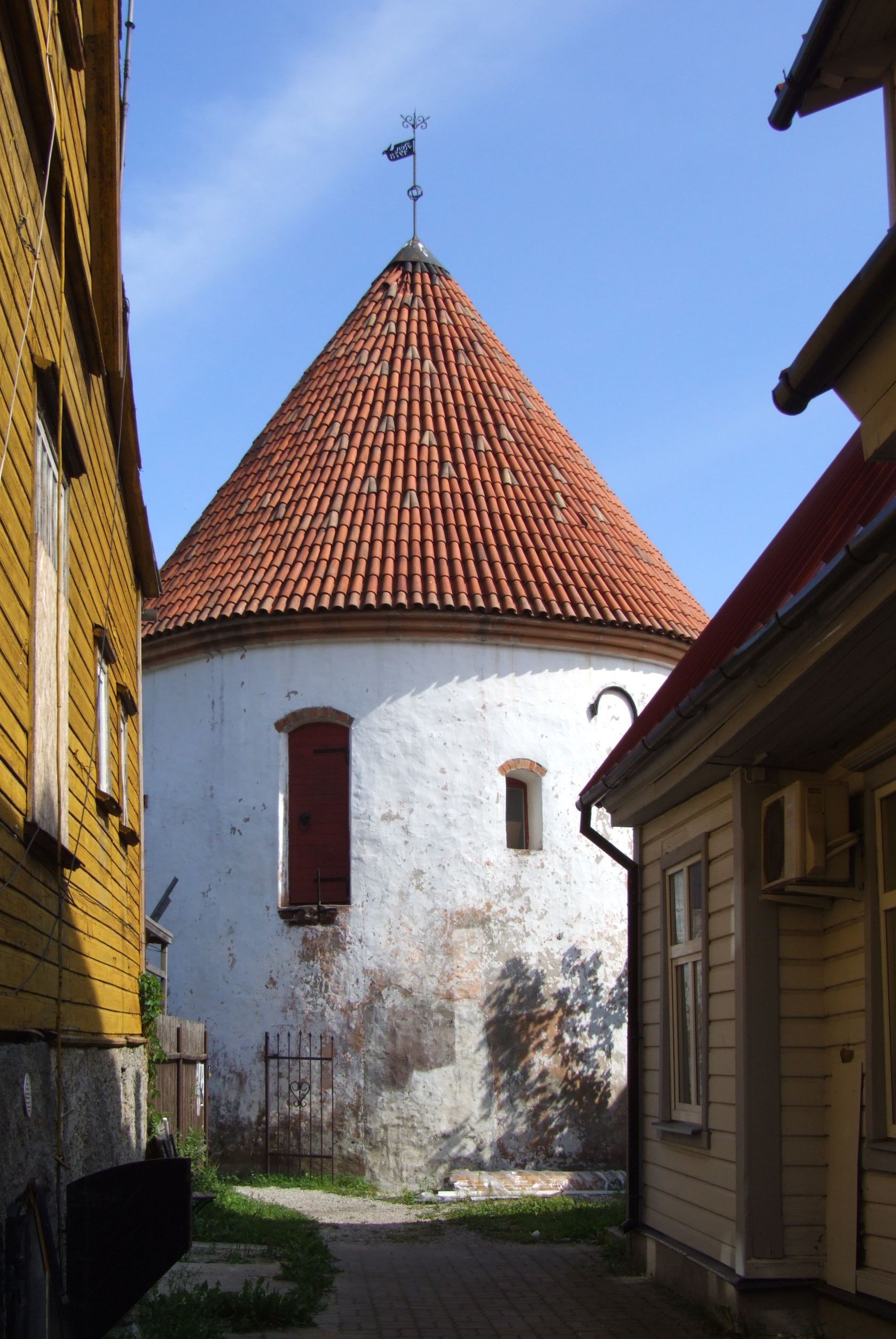

Site information
- Type: tower

Location
- Coordinates: 58°23′06″N 24°30′10″E

Red Tower (Pärnu) (Estonian: Punane torn) is a tower in Pärnu, Estonia. The tower is only building of medieval New-Pärnu Fortress, which is preserved until today. The tower is named after the red bricks which are used to line the inside and outside of the tower.

The tower was built in 15th century and it was used as a prison. In the 17th century, the tower had four storeys. Three storeys are preserved until today.

Since 19th century, the building has had several purposes, e.g. for being the town archives.
