= Secundus of Asti =

Roman bishop and martyr

Saint Secundus of Asti
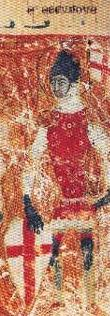
- Image of Saint Secundus, from the Codice della Catena (Turin).

Martyr
- Born: c. 98; Asti, Italy
- Died: 119; Asti, Italy
- Venerated in: Roman Catholic Church; Eastern Orthodox Church; Oriental Orthodox Churches
- Feast: 29 March
- Attributes: a sword, angel bringing him communion
- Patronage: Asti; Ventimiglia

Secundus of Asti (Italian: Secondo di Asti) (died c. 119) is venerated as a martyr and saint. His feast day is generally celebrated on 29 March. Until the 15th century it was celebrated at Asti on 30 March, but it is now celebrated there on the first Tuesday in May. He was a historical figure who was beheaded at Asti under Hadrian. He is said to have been a patrician of Asti and a subaltern officer in the imperial army. It is known that a church was dedicated to him in the area as early as the 9th century.

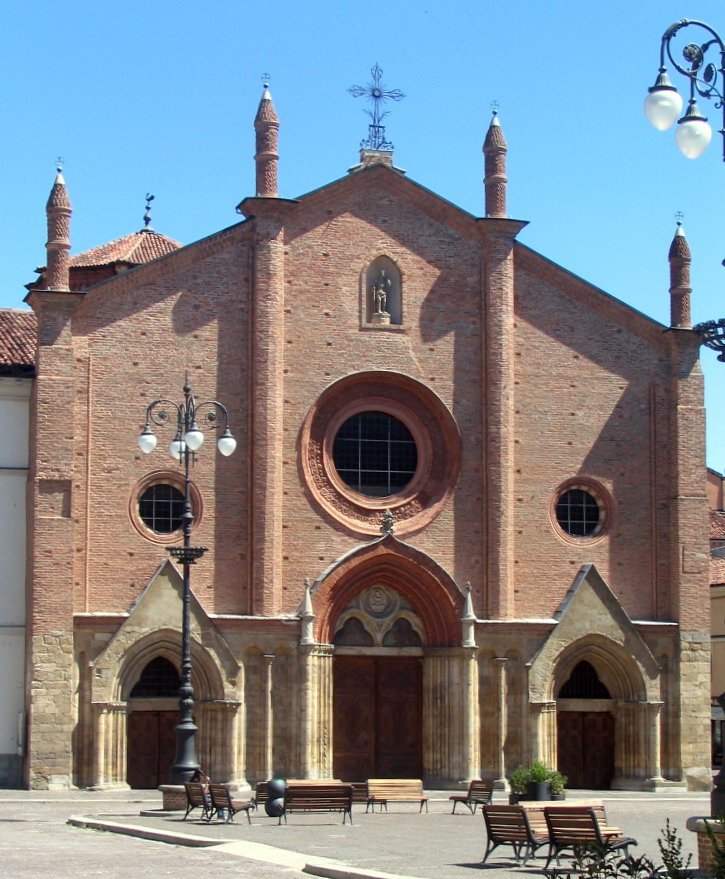
Collegiate church of San Secondo in Asti.

== Legend ==
Later legends made Secundus a member of the Theban Legion. A more elaborate legend states that he was a young man of noble lineage who visited the jails of Asti. Secundus was a friend of Sapricius (Saprizio), prefect of the city. They traveled together to the city of Tortona, where Secundus met the city's first bishop, Marcian, who was later martyred under Hadrian. Secundus' meeting with Marcian influenced his decision to become a Christian; his meeting with Faustinus and Jovita further influenced his conversion. His friend Sapricius attempted to make him abjure his newfound faith. Secundus refused, and was tortured and decapitated.

== Veneration ==
The codex called the Codice della Catena depicts Octavius, Adventor, Solutor, Maximus of Turin, John the Baptist, and Secundus of Asti. Bernardo Strozzi painted his St Secundus and Angel around 1640.
