= Paleologo-Oriundi =

Italian noble family

Paleologo-Oriundi Paleologo, Calabraga, Oriundi
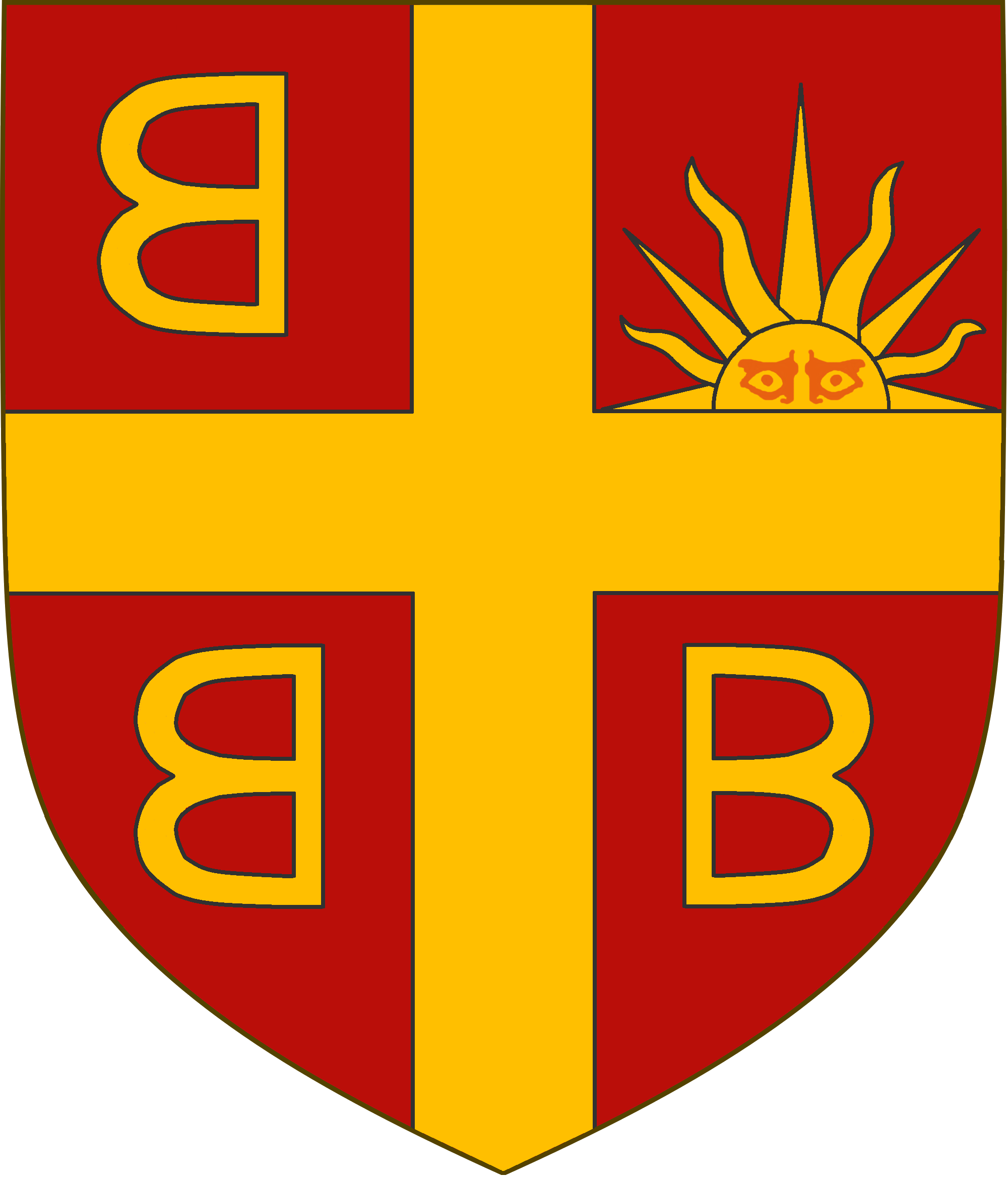
- Coat of arms of the family, derived from the tetragrammatic cross of the Byzantine Palaiologoi
- Parent house: Palaeologus-Montferrat (claimed)
- Country: Italy
- Founded: 1518 (claimed)
- Founder: Flaminio Paleologo (claimed)
- Current head: Carlo Paleologo-Oriundi
- Traditions: Roman Catholicism
- Cadet branches: Quintini-Paleologo (matrilineal; extinct)

The Paleologo-Oriundi are an Italian family which dubiously claims descent from Flaminio Paleologo, an illegitimate son of John George Palaeologus, Marquis of Montferrat 1530–1533. John George's family, the Palaeologus-Montferrat family descended from Theodore Palaiologos, a son of Byzantine Emperor Andronikos II Palaiologos (r. 1282–1328). Though portions of their recent claimed ancestry are documented, contradictions in their genealogy exist and their descent remains incompletely verified and disputed, with some genealogists wholly dismissing their claims. If they were to be genuine, the Paleologo-Oriundi would be male-line descendants of the last dynasty of Byzantine emperors, though they would not be considered part of that dynasty proper on account of their descent through an illegitimate son.

According to their own family histories, early members of the family simply used the name Paleologo. They also claim that the last name Calabraga, supposedly originally assumed by a member of the family who was fleeing the law, saw periodical usage in the 16th century. The name Oriundi was allegedly first assumed in the late 17th century, "oriundo" meaning an immigrant that is originally of Italian ancestry, a word linguistically related to the term orient (east). Paleologo (or Paleologo-Oriundi) was assumed by the family only in 1930 following a court decision; the Paleologo-Oriundi were not the only dubious claimants to Byzantine ancestry recognized by Italian courts in the 20th century and such courts typically did not closely investigate the veracity of the claims.

== Claimed family tree ==
Follows Mallat (1990) and Mallat (2007). Heads of the family marked with bold text, women marked with italics.

House of Palaeologus-Montferrat
Flaminio I 1518–1571
Teodoro I ?–1586	Giovanni ?–1540	Ferdinando	Laura	Isabella	Margherita	Eleonora
Flaminio II; 1562–1624	Federico; 1566–1608	A daughter	Bernardino
Federico	Pietro I 1582–?	Bonifacio ?–1630
Domenica; 1621–?	Biagio I 1622–?	Giovanni; 1624–1625	Bernardo; 1624–1633	Bonifacio fl. 1679
Isabella; 1666–1712	Pietro II; 1667–1704	Giambattista fl. 1687
Lucia; 1692–1711	Biagio II ?–1753	Caterina	Bernardina	Maria Teresa	Silvio ?–1728
Pietro III; 1719–?	Giovanni Battista ?–1721	Antonio	Maria Domenica	Maria Elisabetta	Maria Domenica	Tommasa Bernardina
Maria Elisabetta; 1743–?	Maria Giovanna; 1745–1845	Michele; 1755–1816	Francesco ?–1812	Settimio ?–1812	Ottavio ?–1812	Noe ?–1812	Bernardo	Leonardo	Ercolano	Mariano
Giuseppe; 1792–1861	Andrea; 1805–1865	(Several daughters)
Luciano ?–1904	Federico; 1858–1920	(Nine other children)
Ida; 1854–1927	Achille Quintini	Arnaldo; 1888–1939	Ottorino; 1891–1916	(One more child)
Quintini-Paleologo family	Teodoro II; 1920–1992	Gabriella; 1922–1990	Carlo b. 1924
Alessandra	Patrizia	Elena	Andrea b. 1952	Maurizio b. 1956
Marco b. 1981	Carlo b. 1984

== Background ==
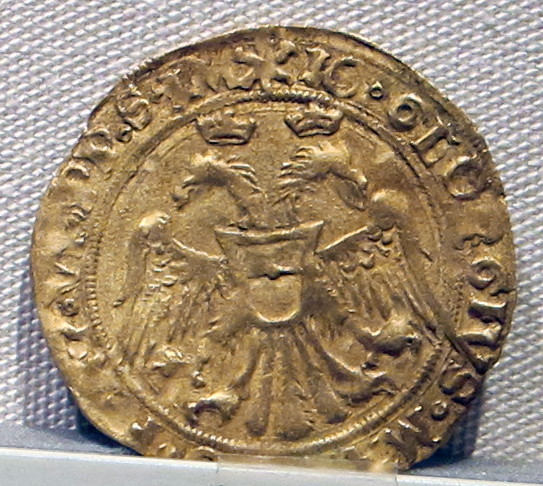
Gold coin of John George Palaeologus, the last Marquis of the Palaeologus-Montferrat line. The coin displays the double-headed eagle iconography of the Byzantine Palaiologos dynasty.

The Palaeologus-Montferrat family was a medieval cadet branch of the Palaiologos dynasty, the last ruling family of the Byzantine Empire. It was created in 1306 when Theodore Palaiologos, fourth son of Byzantine Emperor Andronikos II Palaiologos (r. 1282–1328), inherited the March of Montferrat through his mother, and Andronikos II's second wife, Yolande of Montferrat. Andronikos II's fourth son, rather than one of the older sons, was specifically chosen to not jeopardize the imperial line of succession.

The Byzantine aristocracy were unenthusiastic about the creation of a western cadet branch of the imperial family; that a Byzantine prince, born in the purple, would be sent to live among, and rule over, Latin barbarians, was bad enough but there were also fears that he and his descendants might become 'Latinised' and that the Italians, as a result of the Montferrat inheritance, could launch an invasion in the future in hopes of placing a Catholic Palaiologos on the Byzantine throne. Byzantine fears of Latinisation became true; Theodore converted to Catholicism and on his subsequent visits to Constantinople, Theodore shocked the Byzantines with his shaven face and Western customs.

The Palaeologus-Montferrat family ruled at Montferrat until the 16th century. Though they were sometimes given Greek names, such as Theodore and Sophia, most of the Palaiologan Marquises of Montferrat paid little attention to affairs in the eastern Mediterranean. The only Marquis to seriously consider using his Byzantine connection was Theodore's son, John II of Montferrat, who wished to take advantage of the Byzantine civil war of 1341–1347, between Andronikos II's great-grandson John V (r. 1341–1391) and John VI Kantakouzenos (r. 1347–1354), in order to invade the empire and conquer the city of Thessalonica. In his will from 1372, John II claimed that Andronikos II's deposition in 1328 by his grandson Andronikos III (John V's father, r. 1328–1341) had been unlawful and thus disqualified Andronikos III and all his heirs from the legitimate line of succession to the throne of Byzantium. John II also pointed out that since Andronikos II had disinherited Andronikos III, John II was the rightful emperor as the only true heir to Andronikos II. John II even petitioned the Papacy to recognize his claims to Thessalonica and to the empire, and to help him conquer them. An expedition to "recover" these territories was never organised.

== Claimed family history ==
Upon the death of John George Palaeologus, the last Marquis of Montferrat of the Palaeologus-Montferrat family, on 30 April 1533, Montferrat was inherited by the Gonzaga family of Mantua. The new marquis, Federico II Gonzaga, was connected to the family by marriage, being the husband of Margaret Paleologa, niece of John George. Federico had married Margaret on 3 October 1531, with the explicit goal of acquiring Montferrat. The deaths of John George and later Margaret did not spell the end for the male-line lineage of the Palaeologus-Montferrat family. John George had an illegitimate son, Flaminio Paleologo, born in 1518, whom the marquis had unsuccessfully attempted to have legitimised. Although Flaminio would end his life accused of conspiracy against the Gonzagas, being violently killed in prison on 24 May 1571, he would supposedly be survived by seven children. The accusations against Flaminio were true, as he had unsuccessfully worked to overthrow the Gonzagas and gain control of Montferrat. Two of Flaminio's supposed sons are said to have had children of their own, with there being an extinct lineage descending from his younger son Ferdinando, and a lineage descending from his older son Teodoro. The Paleologo-Oriundi family claims descent from Teodoro, and though their lineage is partially documented, contradictions exist. If they were to be genuine male-line descendants, they would still not be considered true members of the Palaeologus-Montferrat family, or the Palaiologos dynasty itself, on account of descent through an illegitimate son.

According to the Paleologo-Oriundi family, Flaminio's eldest son, Teodoro (?–1586), was also accused of conspiracy and took refuge in his wife's homeland, Camerano, near Ancona. In order to pass unnoticed, he adopted the fake last name Calabraga, which would periodically be adopted by later members of the family as well. The Paleologo-Oriundi also claim that Teodoro's son, Flaminio II (1562–1624), was granted the right to use the title Prince of the Holy Roman Empire by Ferdinand II, Holy Roman Emperor (r. 1619–1637). Flaminio II's great-grandson, Pietro II (1667–1704), was the first to use the name Oriundi. The word oriundo (of which Oriundi is the plural form) is an Italian noun describing an immigrant that is originally of Italian ancestry, it comes from the Latin oriri and is linguistically related to the term Orient (east).

Four brothers of the Paleologo-Oriundi family—Francesco, Settimio, Ottavio and Noe—supposedly died in 1812 fighting for Napoleon in the French invasion of Russia.

== Modern family ==
The earliest biography published by a member of the family was the work of Federico (1858–1920), who claimed to be the great-great-great-grandson of Pietro II, published by his friend J. Chinaki in 1932. Federico's son Arnaldo (1888–1939) was a lawyer in Venice and fought in the First World War. He also worked as a historian and wrote extensively on the history of his family, together with his brother Ottorino (1891–1916), their work being published in the Italian heraldic magazine Rivista Araldica. The current head of the family is Arnaldo's son Carlo Paleologo-Oriundi (born 1924), a Venetian banker who lives in Mestre. The Paleologo-Oriundi only added "Paleologo" to their family name in 1930, changing the earlier "Oriundi" to "Paleologo-Oriundi" through a court decision. The legal system of 20th century Italy provided ample grounds for claimants and imposters, and the Paleologo-Oriundi, whether genuine or not, were not the only who managed to secure limited legal recognition for claims of Byzantine descent. The Italian courts who gave out "recognitions" typically did not investigate the claims of the families. In 1988, the historian M. L. Bierbrier deemed the Paleologo-Oriundi and other modern claimants to Palaiologos descent to be dubious, and that such claims should "not be taken seriously by any genealogist".

There existed a cadet branch of the Paleologo-Oriundi family native to Rome, the Quintini-Paleologo, descended matrilineally from Giuseppe (1792–1861), uncle of Federico. It was founded through the marriage of Giuseppe's granddaughter Ida (1854–1927) and Achille Quintini. Ida and Achille had five children; the son Adolfo (1893–1960) and four daughters. Though Adolfo simply used the name Quintini, Adolfo's son Giorgio (1933–2013) assumed the full last name Quintini Paleologo in the 1960s, a name which was not recognised by the Paleologo-Oriundi in Venice, who opposed matrilineal descendants using the Paleologo name. Giorgio was Adolfo's only child and was unmarried and childless. With his death in 2013, this short-lived cadet branch went extinct.
