= Palaiologos =

Byzantine imperial family

Palaiologos Παλαιολόγος Palaeologus, Palaeologue
- Imperial dynasty
- Double-headed eagle with the family cypher
- Country: Byzantine Empire; March of Montferrat; Ottoman Empire; Others
- Founded: 11th century 1259; 767 years ago (as imperial family)
- Founder: Nikephoros Palaiologos (first known; possibly founder); Michael VIII Palaiologos (first emperor)
- Final ruler: Constantine XI Palaiologos (Byzantine Empire); Thomas & Demetrios Palaiologos (Morea); John George Palaeologus (Montferrat)
- Final head: Andreas Palaiologos (Note: Last confidently verified member of the imperial Palaiologos dynasty.) (c. 1520; 506 years ago); Margaret Paleologa (Note: Last member of the Palaeologus-Montferrat cadet branch.) (1566; 460 years ago); Godscall Paleologue (Note: Last known member of the Paleologus family of Pesaro, Cornwall and Barbados, which claimed descent from Thomas Palaiologos. Scholars are divided on whether the family's descent is genuine, likely, plausible, unproven or unlikely.) (c. 1694; 332 years ago)
- Titles: Emperor and Autocrat of the Romans; Despot of the Morea; Marquis of Montferrat; Grand Vizier of the Ottoman Empire
- Traditions: Greek Orthodoxy (predominantly; 11th–15th century); Roman Catholicism (Montferrat lineage, lineages in exile)
- Heirlooms: Head of the Apostle Andrew
- Deposition: 1453; 573 years ago (Byzantine Empire); 1460; 566 years ago (Despotate of the Morea); 1533; 493 years ago (March of Montferrat)
- Cadet branches: Palaeologus-Montferrat; Asen Palaiologos (matrilineal); Paleologo-Oriundi (dispute)

The House of Palaiologos (pl. Palaiologoi; Byzantine Greek: Παλαιολόγος, pl. Παλαιολόγοι; female version Palaiologina; Byzantine Greek: Παλαιολογίνα), also found in English-language literature as Palaeologus or Palaeologue, was a Byzantine Greek noble family that rose to power and produced the last and longest-ruling dynasty in the history of the Byzantine Empire. Their rule as Byzantine emperors lasted almost two hundred years, from 1259 to the fall of Constantinople in 1453.

The origins of the family are unclear. Their own medieval origin stories ascribed them an ancient and prestigious origin in ancient Roman Italy, descended from some of the Romans that had accompanied Constantine the Great to Constantinople upon its foundation in 330. It is more likely that they originated significantly later in Anatolia since the earliest known member of the family, possibly its founder, Nikephoros Palaiologos, served as a commander there in the second half of the 11th century. Over the course of the 12th century, the Palaiologoi were mostly part of the military aristocracy, not recorded as occupying any administrative political offices, and they frequently intermarried with the then ruling Komnenos family, increasing their prestige. When Constantinople fell to the Fourth Crusade in 1204, the Palaiologoi fled to the Empire of Nicaea, a Byzantine successor state ruled by the House of Laskaris, where they continued to play an active role and occupied many offices of high rank.

In 1259, Michael VIII Palaiologos became co-emperor to the young John IV Laskaris through a coup and in 1261, following the recapture of Constantinople from the Latin Empire, John IV was deposed and blinded. Michael's successors ruled the Byzantine Empire at its weakest point in history, and much of the Palaiologan period was a time of political and economic decline, partly due to external enemies such as the Bulgarians, Serbs and Ottoman Turks, and partly due to frequent civil wars between members of the Palaiologos family. By the beginning of the 15th century, the emperors had lost any real power, with the empire effectively having become a client state to the new Ottoman Empire. Their rule of the empire continued until 1453 when Ottoman sultan Mehmed the Conqueror conquered Constantinople and the final Palaiologan emperor, Constantine XI Palaiologos, died in the city's defense. During their rule as emperors, the Palaiologoi were not well-liked by their subjects, mostly on account of their religious policy. The repeated attempts by the emperors to reunite the Greek Orthodox Church with the Roman Catholic Church, and thus place the Byzantine church in submission under the Papacy, was viewed as heresy and treason. Though Constantine XI died in communion with Rome (and thus as a "heretic"), his death in battle against the Ottomans, defending Constantinople, made the Greeks and the Orthodox church remember him as a hero, redeeming popular opinion of the dynasty as a whole. The role of the Palaiologoi as the final Christian dynasty to rule over Greek lands also accorded them a more positive remembrance among Greeks during the period of Ottoman rule.

The last certain members of the imperial line of the Palaiologoi died out in the 16th century, but female-line descendants survive to the present day. A cadet branch in Italy, the Palaeologus-Montferrat, ruled the March of Montferrat until 1536 and died out in 1566. Because the family was extensive before it produced emperors, the name Palaiologos was legitimately held not only by nobles part of the actual imperial dynasty. As a result, many Byzantine refugees who fled to Western Europe in the aftermath of Constantinople's fall possessed the name and in order to earn prestige, some fabricated closer links to the imperial family. The genealogies of many supposedly surviving branches of the imperial dynasty have readily been dismissed as fantasy by modern researchers. Various lineages of non-imperial Palaialogoi, whose relation to the medieval Palaiologoi and each other are unclear, survived into the modern period and thousands of people, particularly in Greece, still have the last name Palaiologos, or variants thereof, today.

== Origin ==
Map of Byzantine Anatolia in the 9th century. The Palaiologos family may have originated in the Anatolic Theme in central Anatolia.

The origins of the Palaiologos family are unclear. According to several later oral traditions, the family had originated in Italy, supposedly in the city of Viterbo. As per this version, the family name Palaiologos (Palaios logos, lit. "old word") was a Greek translation of vetus verbum, a dubious etymology of Viterbo. Such stories were popularized by later obscure Palaiologoi who had settled in northern Italy and were tempted to invent an ancestral link with the last Byzantine Emperors. Another tale maintained that the ancestors of Palaiologoi were among the Roman patricians who traveled to Constantinople accompanying Constantine the Great when the city was founded and designated as the Roman Empire's new capital in 330. This origin story is similar to the traditions of other Byzantine noble families, such as the Doukas or Phokas clans, who also used stories of ancient Roman descent to bolster their prestige and somewhat legitimize their claims to the throne of the Byzantine Empire, the Roman Empire's medieval continuation.

In contrast to these ancient and prestigious origin stories, the Palaiologoi probably actually originated relatively late in Anatolia, possibly in the Anatolic Theme. The etymology of their family name was believed to be "ragman" by Soviet-American Byzantinist Alexander Kazhdan, possibly referencing humble origins, whereas the French Byzantinist Jean-François Vannier believes the correct etymology to be "antique collector". The earliest known member of the family, possibly its founder, was Nikephoros Palaiologos, commander (possibly doux) of the Theme of Mesopotamia in the second half of the 11th century, in the reign of Emperor Michael VII Doukas. Nikephoros supported the revolt of Nikephoros III Botaneiates against Michael VII, but his son, George Palaiologos, married Anna Doukaina and thus supported the Doukas family and later Alexios I Komnenos, Anna's brother-in-law, against Botaneiates. George served as the doux of Dyrrhachium in the reign of Alexios I and was accorded the title of kouropalates.

In the 12th century, the Palaiologoi were mainly recorded as members of the military aristocracy, not occupying any administrative political offices. They are recorded numerous times as donors to monasteries, and intermarried several times with the Komnenos dynasty during its rule over the Byzantine Empire (1081–1185). When the crusaders of the Fourth Crusade took Constantinople in 1204 and overthrew the Byzantine Empire in favor of the new, Catholic, Latin Empire, the Palaiologoi followed Theodore I Laskaris to the Empire of Nicaea, where they played an active role and continued to occupy offices of high rank. Andronikos Palaiologos, father of the later emperor Michael VIII, was proclaimed megas domestikos (commander-in-chief), probably by Emperor John III Doukas Vatatzes.

The Palaiologoi's many marriages with prominent Byzantine families was reflected in their choice of surnames, with earlier members of the imperial dynasty using the surnames of several of the previous ruling dynasties to reinforce their legitimacy. For instance, Michael VIII Palaiologos's full name was Michael Komnenos Doukas Angelos Palaiologos.

== Imperial line ==
=== Path to the throne ===
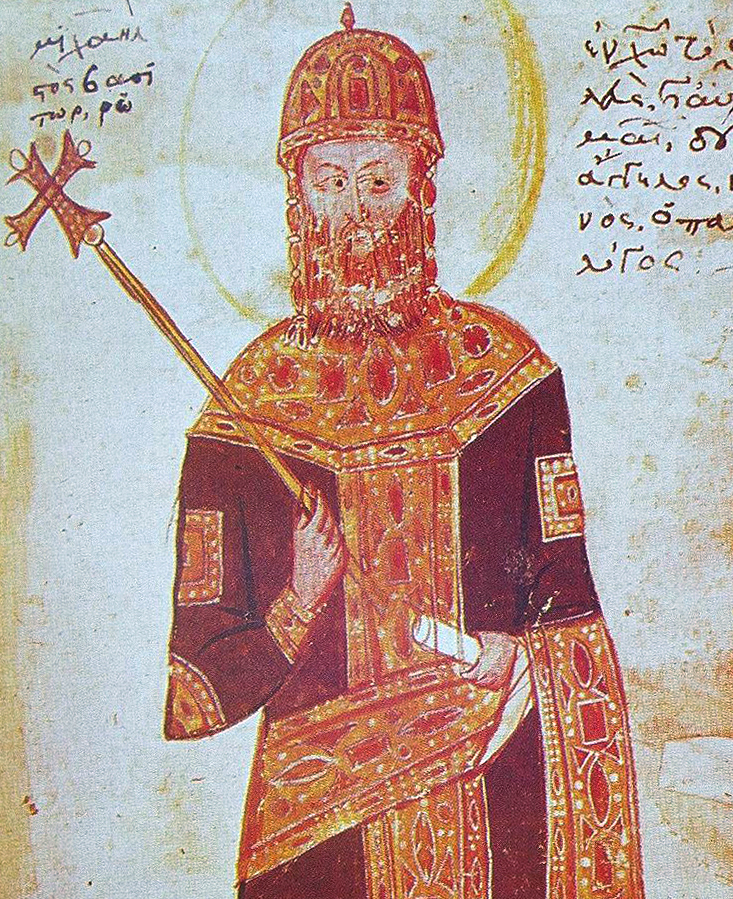
Michael VIII Palaiologos (r. 1259–1282), founder of the imperial Palaiologos dynasty

Michael Palaiologos, born in 1223, was the son of Andronikos Palaiologos, megas domestikos in the Empire of Nicaea. Through the preceding century or so of Palaiologan marriages to other imperial families, his ancestry could be traced back to the three most recent dynasties that had ruled the empire before the Fourth Crusade (Doukas, Komnenos and Angelos). In his youth, Michael had served as the governor of the towns of Melnik and Serres in Thrace, and though he and his family were distinguished among the aristocracy, he was frequently mistrusted by the ruling Laskaris dynasty. In 1253, Emperor John III Doukas Vatatzes accused him of plotting against the throne, though Michael escaped the accusation without punishment following a trial by ordeal of holding a red-hot iron. Though Michael continued to be mistrusted even after this, he married John III's grandniece Theodora Vatatzaina and was appointed as the megas konostaulos of the Latin mercenaries employed by the empire.

After John III's death in 1254, Michael briefly took service with the Seljuk Sultanate of Rum, frequent enemies of the empire, and from 1256 to 1258 he was the commander of the Christian mercenaries fighting for the Seljuk Sultan Kaykaus II. John III's son and successor, Theodore II Laskaris, recalled Michael in 1258 and after they had exchanged guarantees of safety and oaths of loyalty, Michael returned to service within the empire. Theodore II died in that same year and was succeeded by his eight-year-old son John IV Laskaris. Just a few days after Theodore's death, Michael led a coup against the bureaucrat George Mouzalon, who had been appointed regent by Theodore II. Michael seized the guardianship of the child emperor and was invested with the titles of megas doux and despotes. On 1 January 1259, Michael was proclaimed as co-emperor at Nymphaion, probably without John IV being present.

On 25 July 1261, Nicene forces under general Alexios Strategopoulos recaptured Constantinople from the Latin Empire, restoring the city to Byzantine rule after almost sixty years in foreign hands. After the recapture of the capital and the restoration of the Byzantine Empire, Michael took care to be crowned emperor in Hagia Sophia, as Byzantine emperors had been before the city was lost to the crusaders. John IV, the last representative of the imperial Laskaris dynasty, was pushed aside in order to consolidate the Palaiologos family on the throne. On John IV's eleventh birthday, 25 December 1261, the boy was deposed, blinded and confined to a monastery. Once news of the act, the blinding of not only the legitimate emperor, but an underage boy, got out, the Patriarch of Constantinople, Arsenios Autoreianos, excommunicated Michael. The emperor's excommunication was not lifted until nine years into his reign, upon the appointment of Patriarch Joseph I. The blinding of John IV was a stain on the Palaiologan dynasty. In 1284, Michael's son and successor Andronikos II Palaiologos visited the blinded and then 33-year-old John IV during a journey in Anatolia, hoping to demonstrate his disapproval with his father's actions.

=== Civil war and disintegration ===
Imperial banner adopted by the Palaiologos dynasty in the 14th century

The Palaiologoi ruled Byzantium at its weakest point in history, and the empire underwent significant economical and political decline. Even in this state, the empire, famous for its frequent civil wars, was unable to stay united. In 1320, Emperor Andronikos II Palaiologos attempted to disinherit his grandson Andronikos III Palaiologos, despite the death of Andronikos II's son, heir and co-emperor Michael IX Palaiologos (Andronikos III's father). Andronikos III secured the support of a significant number of the aristocracy and a period of civil war, not ended until 1328, ensued. Although Andronikos III was ultimately victorious and Andronikos II was deposed, the empire was damaged economically and for the first time, foreign states such as Bulgaria and Serbia had appeared as significant regulating factors in imperial dynastic disputes (joining opposite sides of the civil war).

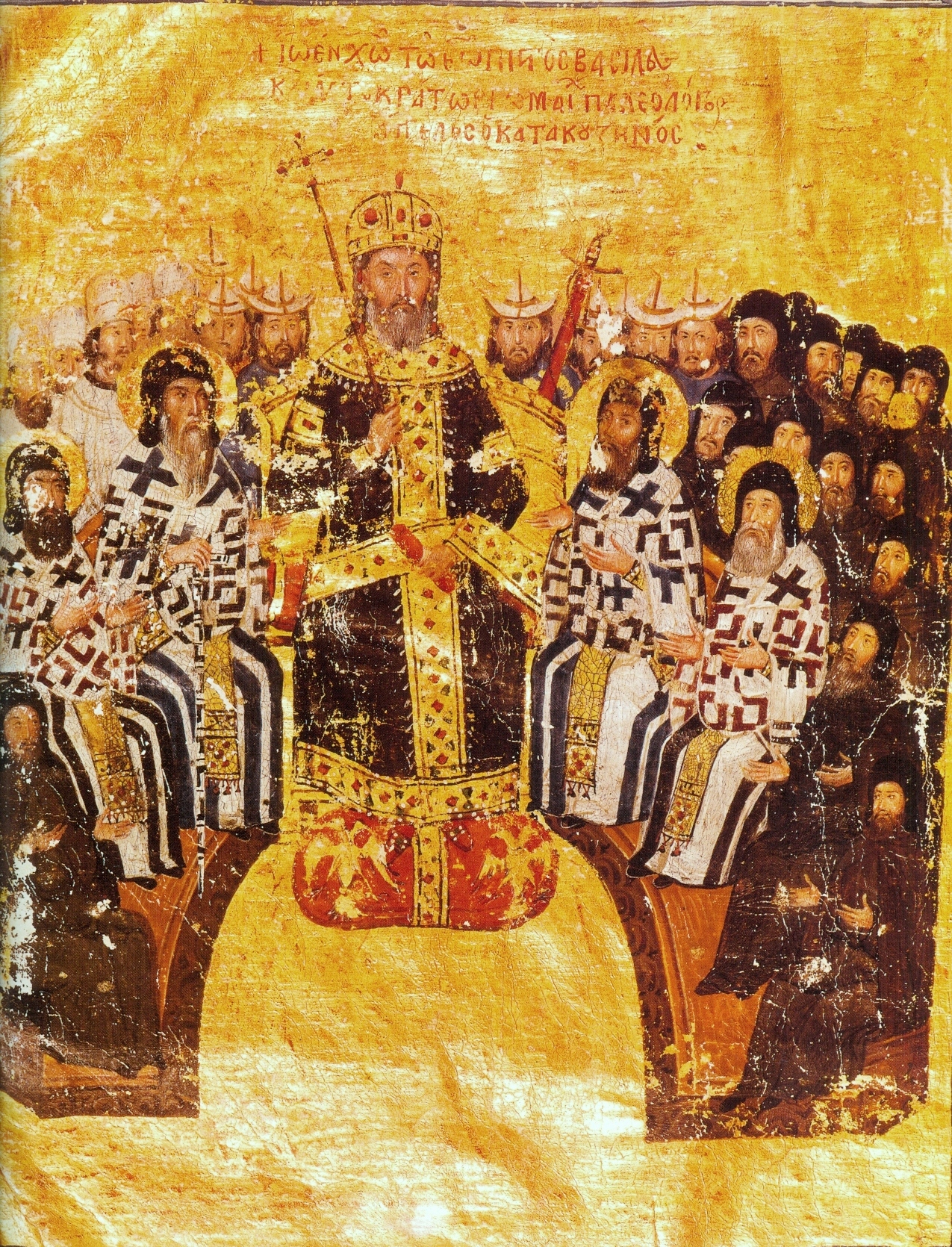
John VI Kantakouzenos (center, r. 1347–1354) nearly succeeded in deposing the Palaiologos dynasty in favor of his own family, the Kantakouzenoi.

When Andronikos III died in 1341, his underage son John V Palaiologos inherited the throne. Disputes between John V's mother Anna of Savoy and the Patriarch John XIV on one side and Andronikos III's friend and megas domestikos John Kantakouzenos on the other led to a new and devastating civil war, lasting until 1347 and won by John Kantakouzenos, who became senior co-emperor as John VI. The weakening of Byzantium as a result of the civil war allowed Stefan Dušan of Serbia to invade Macedonia, Thessaly and Epirus in 1346–1348, creating the Serbian Empire. In the meantime, John VI Kantakouzenos attempted to consolidate his own dynasty on the imperial throne, marrying his daughter Helena to John V and proclaiming his son Matthew Kantakouzenos as co-emperor. Clearly intending to usurp the throne, a new series of civil wars from 1352 to 1357 were eventually won by John V, deposing the Kantakouzenoi. In 1382, the Kantakouzenoi were also driven out of the Morea (the modern-day Peloponnese) and John V's son Theodore was placed to govern it as the semi-independent Despot of the Morea, an important victory as the region was quickly becoming the most important Byzantine province. The Byzantine civil wars, and the collapse of Stefan Dušan's Serbian Empire following his death in 1355, had allowed the Ottoman Turks to expand almost unopposed through the Balkans and in the second half of the 14th century, the empire passed almost without a fight under Ottoman sovereignty, forced to pay tribute and offer military aid if needed.

In 1373, John V's son and heir Andronikos IV Palaiologos rebelled against his father in an attempt to seize the throne, instigating a fourth series of Palaiologan civil wars. John V was initially victorious, imprisoning and disinheriting Andronikos IV and appointing a younger son, Manuel II Palaiologos, as his successor instead. However, Andronikos eventually escaped from prison and successfully took the throne in 1376 with aid from Genoa, imprisoning his father and his younger brother. John V retook the throne in 1379 but reached an agreement with Andronikos in 1381, wherein Andronikos was to succeed him as emperor, passing over Manuel. Andronikos died in 1385 and his son, John VII Palaiologos briefly managed to usurp the throne in 1390. Following this, Manuel II was firmly established as John V's successor, becoming senior emperor upon John's death in 1391.

Though most of the Palaiologan era was defined by decline and war, it was also an age of cultural flourishing, beginning in the late 13th century. Advances in science and the arts, referred to as the Palaiologan Renaissance, lasted throughout the dynasty's rule, encouraged by the efforts of some emperors such as Andronikos II and Manuel II.

=== Last emperors of Byzantium ===
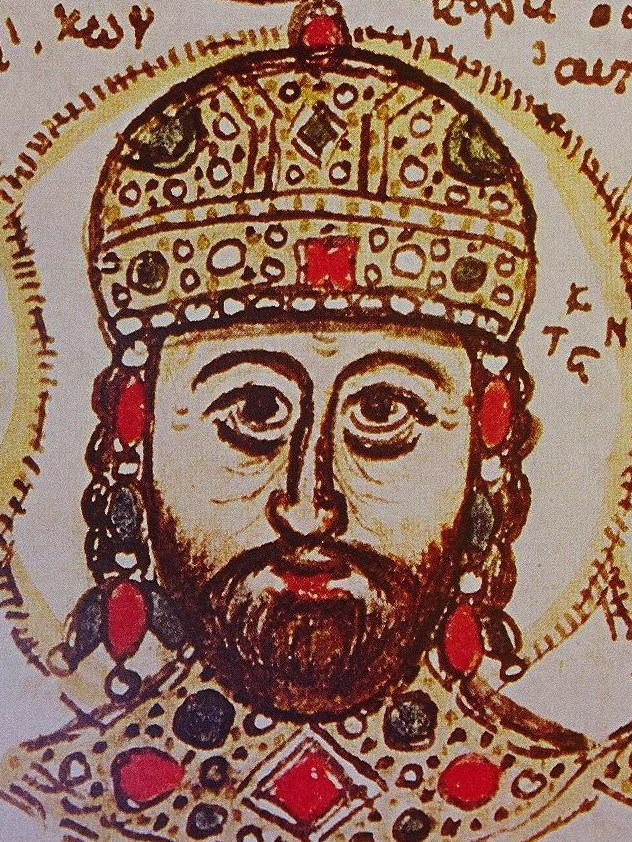
Constantine XI Palaiologos (r. 1449–1453), the final Byzantine Emperor

By the 15th century, the Byzantine emperors had lost any real power, with the Ottoman sultans increasingly becoming the real regulators of political matters within the empire. Despite their de facto submission under the Ottomans, the Byzantines continued to act with hostility against them. In 1394, Manuel II ceased to pay tribute to the Ottoman sultan Bayezid I, who responded by besieging Constantinople. Bayezid's siege lasted for more than a decade, with Western aid through the Crusade of Nicopolis (1396) failing to stop the sultan. The situation was so dire that Manuel left Constantinople to travel around Western Europe asking for further aid against the Ottomans, visiting Italy, France and England. Ultimately, the siege was resolved peacefully by Manuel through signing a peace treaty with Bayezid's son and successor, Mehmed I, in 1403, which among other things returned the city of Thessaloniki, captured by the Ottomans in 1387, to Byzantine rule.

There was peace between the Palaiologans and the Ottomans until 1421, when Mehmed I died and Manuel retired from state affairs, to pursue scholarly and religious interests. Manuel's son, John VIII Palaiologos, co-emperor since before 1416, ignored the fragile peace with the Ottomans and supported Mustafa Çelebi, a pretender to the Ottoman throne, in a rebellion against Mehmed I's successor Murad II. Murad defeated Mustafa's rebellion and besieged Constantinople in 1422, though the Byzantines successfully repulsed him. Even during the final decades of the Byzantine Empire, the Palaiologoi often found it difficult to cooperate with each other. During Manuel II's reign, John VIII and the younger son Constantine appear to have got on well with each other, but the relations between Constantine and the younger brothers Demetrios and Thomas were not as friendly.

Through most of John VIII's reign, Constantine and Thomas ruled as Despots of the Morea, with Demetrios governing a stretch of land in Thrace. Demetrios was unhappy with his subordinate position and assaulted Constantinople in 1442, with Ottoman help, in an attempt to seize the city and become emperor himself. John VIII, aided by Constantine, successfully repulsed this attack and Demetrios was briefly imprisoned as punishment. After John VIII's death in June 1448, the candidates for the throne were brothers Constantine, Demetrios and Thomas. To avoid infighting, their mother Helena Dragaš decided that Constantine was to be the next emperor. Constantine XI Palaiologos's rise to the throne was also accepted by Murad II, who by now had to be consulted for any appointments.

Constantine XI's reign would prove to be brief. Murad II's young son and successor, Mehmed II, who became sultan in 1451, was obsessed with the idea of conquering Constantinople. In an effort to extort money from Mehmed, Constantine implicitly threatened to release Orhan Çelebi, Mehmed's cousin and the only other known living member of the Ottoman dynasty (and as such a potential rival to Mehmed), who was held prisoner in Constantinople. The ill-advised threat gave Mehmed a casus belli and late in 1451, preparations were already underway for a new Ottoman siege of Constantinople. To prevent aid coming from the Morea, now governed by Thomas and Demetrios, Mehmed II sent one of his generals, Turahan Bey (who had raided the Morea twice before) to devastate the peninsula. Constantine also sent desperate pleas for aid to Western Europe, though little help ever arrived. After a 53-day long siege, the city finally fell to the Ottomans on 29 May 1453. Constantine XI died fighting in its defense.

=== After the fall of Constantinople ===
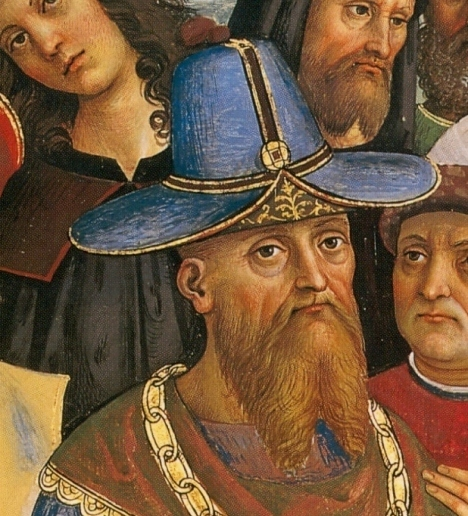
Thomas Palaiologos, younger brother of Constantine XI and Despot of the Morea 1428–1460

In the aftermath of Constantinople's fall, one of the most pressing threats to the new Ottoman regime was the possibility that one of Constantine XI's relatives would secure support and return to reclaim the empire. However, it soon became apparent Constantine's closest relatives, his brothers in the Morea, represented little more than a nuisance to Mehmed II and they were thus allowed to keep their titles and lands as Ottoman vassals. Under their rule, the Morea was transformed into somewhat of a Byzantine government-in-exile, as Byzantine refugees from Constantinople and elsewhere fled to their courts, some even wishing to proclaim Demetrios, the elder brother, as Constantine's successor and the new Emperor and Autocrat of the Romans. The brothers were divided in their policies. Thomas retained hope that the Papacy might yet call for a crusade to restore the Byzantine Empire whereas Demetrios, probably the more realistic of the two, had more or less given up hope of Christian aid from the West and believed it to be best to placate the Turks.

In January 1459, rivalry between the brothers broke out into civil war as Thomas, with the aid of some of the Albanian lords in the Morea, seized a series of fortresses held by Demetrios. The ongoing civil war, and the possibility that Thomas could receive aid from the West since he had proclaimed the war against his brother as a holy war against the Muslims, caused Mehmed to invade the Morea in 1460. Mehmed was victorious and annexed the region directly into the Ottoman Empire, ending Palaiologan rule in Greece. Demetrios surrendered to the Ottomans without a fight and Thomas escaped into exile. Demetrios lived in the Ottoman Empire for the rest of his life, dying in 1470. His only child, his daughter Helena, never married the sultan nor entered the sultan's harem, possibly because the sultan feared that she would poison him. She predeceased her father, dying in 1469.

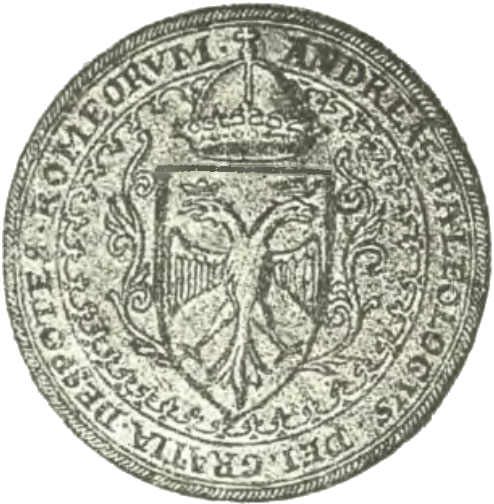
Seal of Andreas Palaiologos, son of Thomas and titular 'Emperor of Constantinople' from the 1480s to his death in 1502

Thomas had four children; Helena, Zoe, Andreas and Manuel. Helena had already been married to Lazar Branković, the Despot of Serbia, but the three younger children, and Thomas's wife Catherine Zaccaria, and a retinue of other refugees, accompanied him as he escaped to the Venetian-held island of Corfu. The local authorities on Corfu were not eager to house the despot out of fear of provoking the Ottomans, so Thomas soon left the island and travelled to Rome, hoping to convince Pope Pius II of calling for a crusade against the Ottomans. Though Pius II was eager to go through with the idea, and Thomas rode around Italy in the hopes of drumming up support for the venture, no crusade materialized this time either. Thomas died on 12 May 1465 and shortly thereafter Zoe, Andreas and Manuel arrived in Rome.

In Rome, the three children were taken care of by Cardinal Bessarion, also a Byzantine refugee. In 1472, according to Bessarion's plans, Zoe (whose name was later changed to Sophia) was married to Grand Prince Ivan III of Moscow. As the oldest son, Andreas was recognized by the Papacy as Thomas's heir and the rightful Despot of the Morea. From the 1480s onwards, Andreas also claimed the title Imperator Constantinopolitanus ('Emperor of Constantinople'). Some Byzantine refugees, such as historian George Sphrantzes, recognized Andreas as the rightful heir of the old emperors. Andreas and Manuel soon faced financial problems, with the pension once provided to their father having been split between the two of them and constantly cut back by the Papacy. Andreas attempted to sell his claims to various Byzantine titles to earn money, but since Manuel did not have any claims to sell (as he was the second son), he instead travelled around Europe hoping to enter into the service of some noble. After not receiving any satisfactory offers, Manuel surprised the establishment in Rome by travelling to Constantinople in 1476 and presenting himself before Sultan Mehmed II. The sultan generously received him and Manuel stayed in Constantinople for the rest of his life.

Andreas died poor in Rome in 1502. Whether he had any children is uncertain. It is possible that a Constantine Palaiologos, employed in the Papal Guard and dead in 1508 was his son. According to Russian sources, he might also have had a daughter, Maria Palaiologina, who married a Russian prince. A Fernando Palaiologos, referred to as the "son of the Despot of the Morea" by Ludovico Sforza, Duke of Milan, in 1499 might also have been a son of Andreas. Andreas's brother Manuel died in Constantinople at some point during the reign of Mehmed II's son and successor Bayezid II (r. 1481–1512). Manuel had two sons; John Palaiologos, who died young, and Andreas, probably named after Manuel's brother. Manuel's son Andreas converted to Islam and might have served as an Ottoman court official. He is last attested in the reign of Suleiman the Magnificent (r. 1520–1566) and is not believed to have had children of his own. Thus, the documented male line of the imperial branch of the House of Palaiologos probably went extinct at some point in the early 16th century.

== Other lineages ==
=== Palaeologus-Montferrat ===
Arms of the Palaeologus-Montferrat family

When the Byzantines reconquered Constantinople in 1261 under Michael VIII Palaiologos, the Papacy suffered a loss of prestige and endured severe damage to its spiritual authority. For 57 years, Constantinople had been under Catholic rule through the Latin Empire and now the easterners had once more asserted their right not only to the position of Roman emperor but also to a church independent of the one centered in Rome. The Popes in the immediate aftermath of the Latin Empire's fall pursued a policy of attempting to assert their religious authority over the Byzantine Empire. Some Western pretenders who wished to restore the Latin Empire, such as the King of Sicily, Charles of Anjou, periodically enjoyed Papal support, and several Popes considered the idea of calling for a new crusade against Constantinople to once more impose Catholic rule.

Michael VIII succeeded in achieving a union of the Catholic and Orthodox churches at the Second Council of Lyons in 1274, legitimizing him and his successors as rulers of Constantinople in the eyes of the West. Michael's son and successor Andronikos II wished to further legitimize the rule of the Palaiologan dynasty. Other crusader states had been formed in Greece as a result of the Fourth Crusade, notably the Kingdom of Thessalonica, which had been ruled by the Aleramici family of Montferrat. In an effort to rid himself of the threat that an Aleramici pretender might launch an invasion and attempt to seize Thessaloniki in the future, Andronikos married Yolande of Montferrat in 1284, bringing her dynastic claims to Thessaloniki into his own family line. Since Yolande was second-in-line to the throne of the March of Montferrat, the marriage had the unexpected result of creating the possibility that a Byzantine prince might inherit Montferrat. When Yolande's brother, John I of Montferrat, died without children in 1305, Montferrat legitimately passed to Yolande and her children.

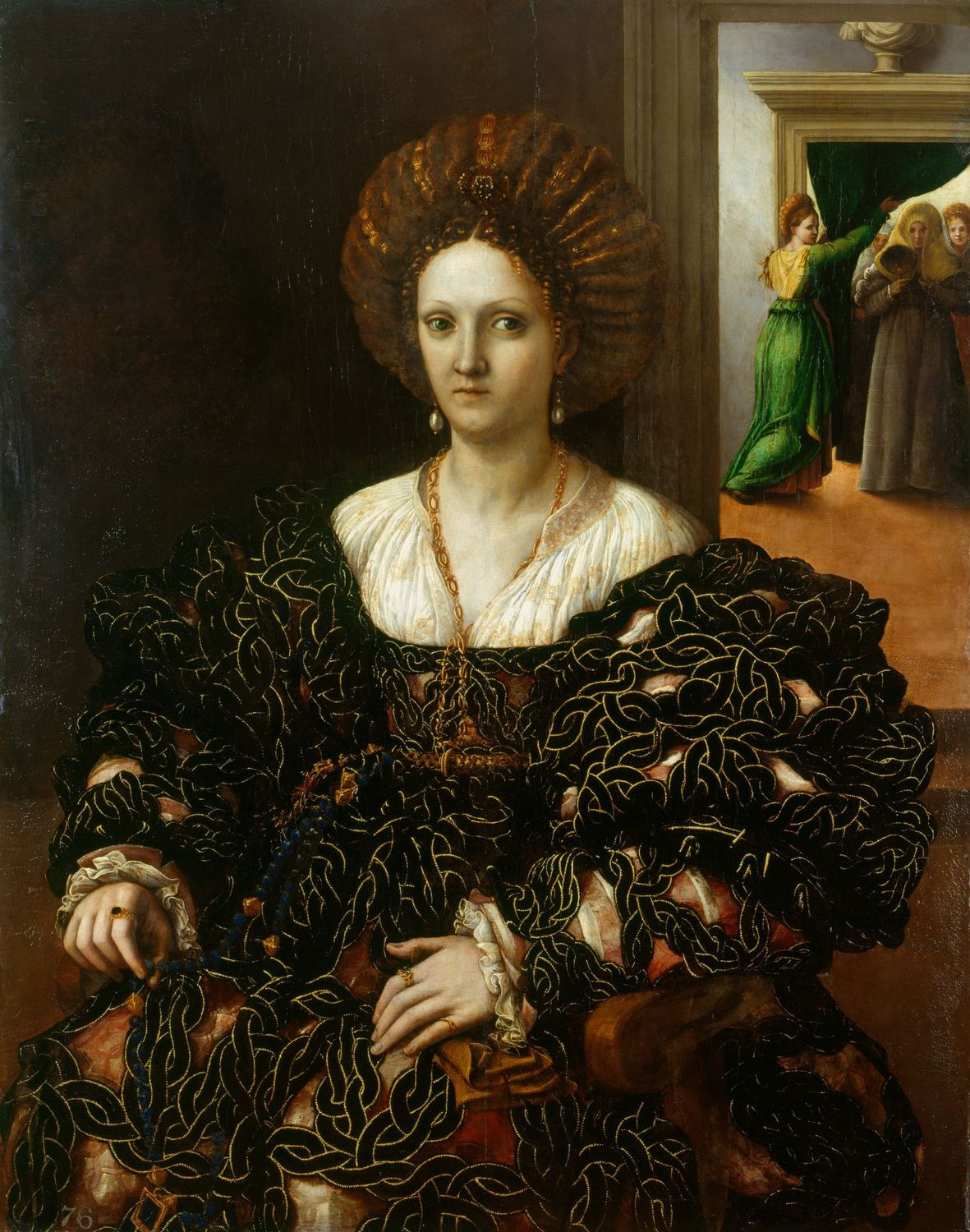
Portrait believed to depict Margaret Paleologa (d. 1566), the last living member of the Palaeologus-Montferrat family

The Byzantine aristocracy were less than eager of sending one of Andronikos II's sons to claim Montferrat. That a Byzantine prince, born in the purple, would be sent to live among, and rule over, Latins, was bad enough but there were also fears that he and his descendants might become 'Latinized' and that the Italians, as a result of the Montferrat inheritance, could launch an invasion in the future in hopes of placing a Catholic Palaiologos on the Byzantine throne. In the end, Andronikos II's fourth son (in order to not jeopardize the line of succession), Theodore, was chosen to travel to Montferrat, arriving there in 1306. Byzantine fears of Latinization became true; Theodore converted to Catholicism and on his visits to Constantinople, Theodore shocked the Byzantines with his shaven face and Western customs.

Theodore's descendants, the Palaeologus-Montferrat family, ruled at Montferrat until the 16th century, though they were sometimes given Greek names, such as Theodore and Sophia, most of the Palaiologan Marquises of Montferrat paid little attention to affairs in the eastern Mediterranean. The only Marquis to seriously consider using his Byzantine connection was Theodore's son, John II of Montferrat, who wished to take advantage of the Byzantine civil war of 1341–1347, between Andronikos II's great-grandson John V and John VI Kantakouzenos, in order to invade the empire and conquer Thessaloniki. In his will from 1372, John II claimed that Andronikos II's deposition in 1328 by his grandson Andronikos III (John V's father) had been unlawful and thus disqualified Andronikos III and all his heirs from the legitimate line of succession to the throne of Byzantium. John II also pointed out that since Andronikos II had disinherited Andronikos III, John II was thus the rightful emperor as the only true heir to Andronikos II. John II even petitioned the Papacy to recognize his claims to Thessaloniki and to the empire, and to help him conquer them. An expedition to "recover" these territories was never organized.

The final Palaeologus Marquis, John George, Marquis of Montferrat, died in 1533 and rule of Montferrat was then given to Federico II Gonzaga, Duke of Mantua, by Holy Roman Emperor Charles V. The last female member, Margaret Paleologa, married to Federico II, died in 1566, rendering the Montferrat cadet branch extinct. Her and Federico II's descendants, with the Gonzaga name, ruled Montferrat until they were supplanted by the House of Savoy, which had also intermarried with the Palaeologus-Montferrat family in the past, in the 18th century. The name "Montferrato-Paleologo" is recorded on the Greek island of Cephalonia until the 17th century, though it is uncertain how they were connected to the Italian family. A modern Italian family, called the Paleologo-Oriundi, claim that they descend from Flaminio, an illegitimate son of John George.

=== Branches of unclear descent ===
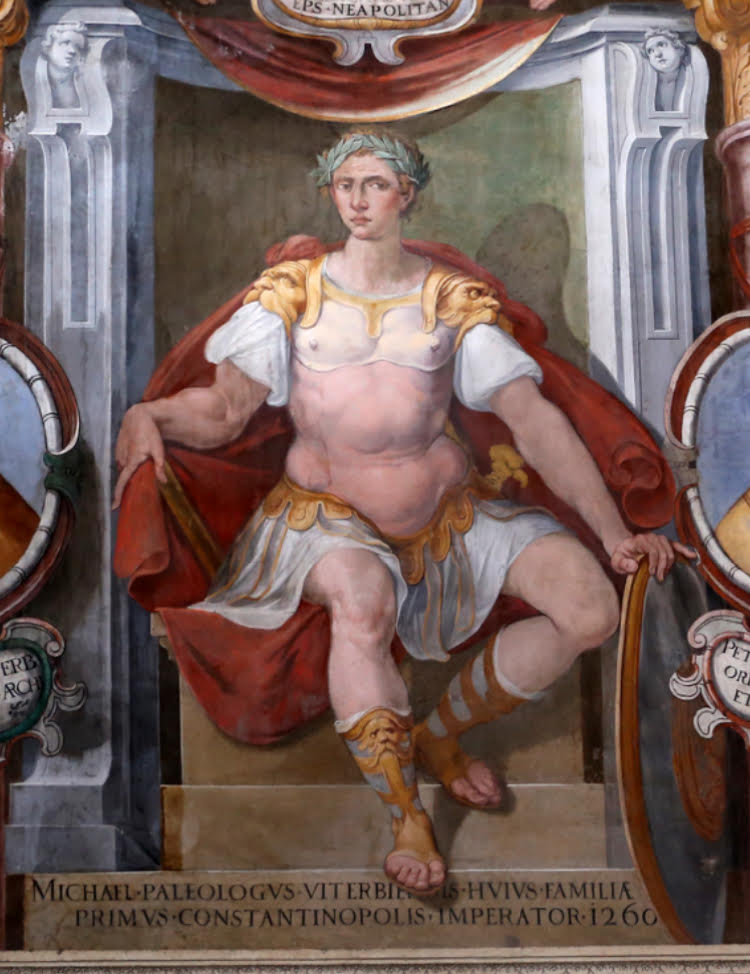
16th-century fresco in Sala Regia of the Palazzo dei Priori, Viterbo. Its Latin inscription reads: "Michael Palaiologos of Viterbo; the first Emperor of Constantinople of this family, 1260"; a reference to the fictional origin of the family from the city of Viterbo.

The probable extinction of the senior branch of the imperial Palaiologos family at some point in the 16th century did little to stop individuals in various parts of Europe from claiming descent from the old imperial dynasty. The family name Palaiologos had been relatively widespread in the Byzantine Empire, and the family had been quite extensive before a branch of it acceded to the imperial throne. Many of the non-imperial Byzantine Palaiologoi were part of the nobility and served as generals or powerful landowners. In addition to the non-imperial Palaiologoi that were descendants of older collateral lines, Byzantine genealogy is also made complicated by the fact that it was common in Byzantium to adopt the family name of one's spouse or mother, if the name was more prestigious.

Many Byzantine nobles found themselves in Constantinople in 1453, fighting against the Ottomans in their final attack. Some, such as Theophilos Palaiologos, died in the battle, whereas others were taken prisoner and executed. Nobles that could escape mostly did, many fleeing to the Morea where they had estates. There, they faced a dilemma. The Byzantine Empire had fallen and the rulers of the Morea, Thomas and Demetrios, appeared more interested in their own rivalry than in organizing resistance against the Ottomans. As such, many of them escaped into Western Europe either before or after the Morea fell in 1460.

Many Byzantine refugees, though unrelated to the emperors, legitimately bore the name Palaiologos due to the extensive nature of the family. Because the name could lend whoever bore it prestige (as well as possible monetary support), many refugees fabricated closer links to the imperial dynasty. Many Western rulers were conscious of their failure to prevent Byzantium's fall and welcomed these men at their courts. The refugees were helped in that many in Western Europe would have been unaware of the intricacies of Byzantine naming customs; to Western Europeans, the name Palaiologos meant the imperial dynasty. Though such Palaiologoi, imperial or not, were mainly concentrated in northern Italy, such as in Pesaro, Viterbo, or Venice, other Greek refugees travelled across Europe, many ending up in Rome, Naples, Milan, Paris or in various cities in Spain.

A special link between the family of Palaiologos and the city of Viterbo was forged based on a specious etymological connection of the Latin Vetus verbum (Viterbo) and the Greek Palaios logos. This link gave a certain degree of prominence to several obscure Palaiologoi who had settled in Italy during the late Middle Ages, and was held as an argument that the family had its roots in the city. Theodore Spandounes mentions a story, according to which the family, originally Romans who arrived in Constantinople in the 4th century, moved to Italy during the exarchate and one of them married in Viterbo. Later, a soldier of the family was said to have come from Viterbo to Greece in the aid of the Lascarid Emperors, where he married and had his son, allegedly the future Emperor Michael VIII Palaiologos (Michael's true parents were Andronikos and Theodora who had lived in the Empire of Nicaea).

'Palaiologos' as a last name continues to survive to this day in various variants. Common versions of the last name used today include the standard Palaiologos (approximately 1,800 people, most common in Greece), Palaiologou (approximately 2,000 people, again most common in Greece), Paleologos (approximately 500 people, most common in the United States but present worldwide) and Paleologo (approximately 250 people, most common in Italy). These modern Palaiologoi cannot be confidently proven to descend from the imperial dynasty, or the medieval family which produced it. Because people with the name live throughout the world and might not even be related in the first place, creating an all-encompassing modern Palaiologos genealogy is next to impossible. It is possible that many of the modern people who bear the name are descended from wealthy Greeks in the Ottoman period, who commonly assumed Byzantine surnames and claimed descent from the famous noble houses of their Byzantine past. Some might be genuine descendants of the imperial family as several of the imperial Palaiologoi are recorded as having had illegitimate children; for instance, Theodore II, Despot of the Morea, is known to have had several illegitimate children.

==== Paleologus of Pesaro ====
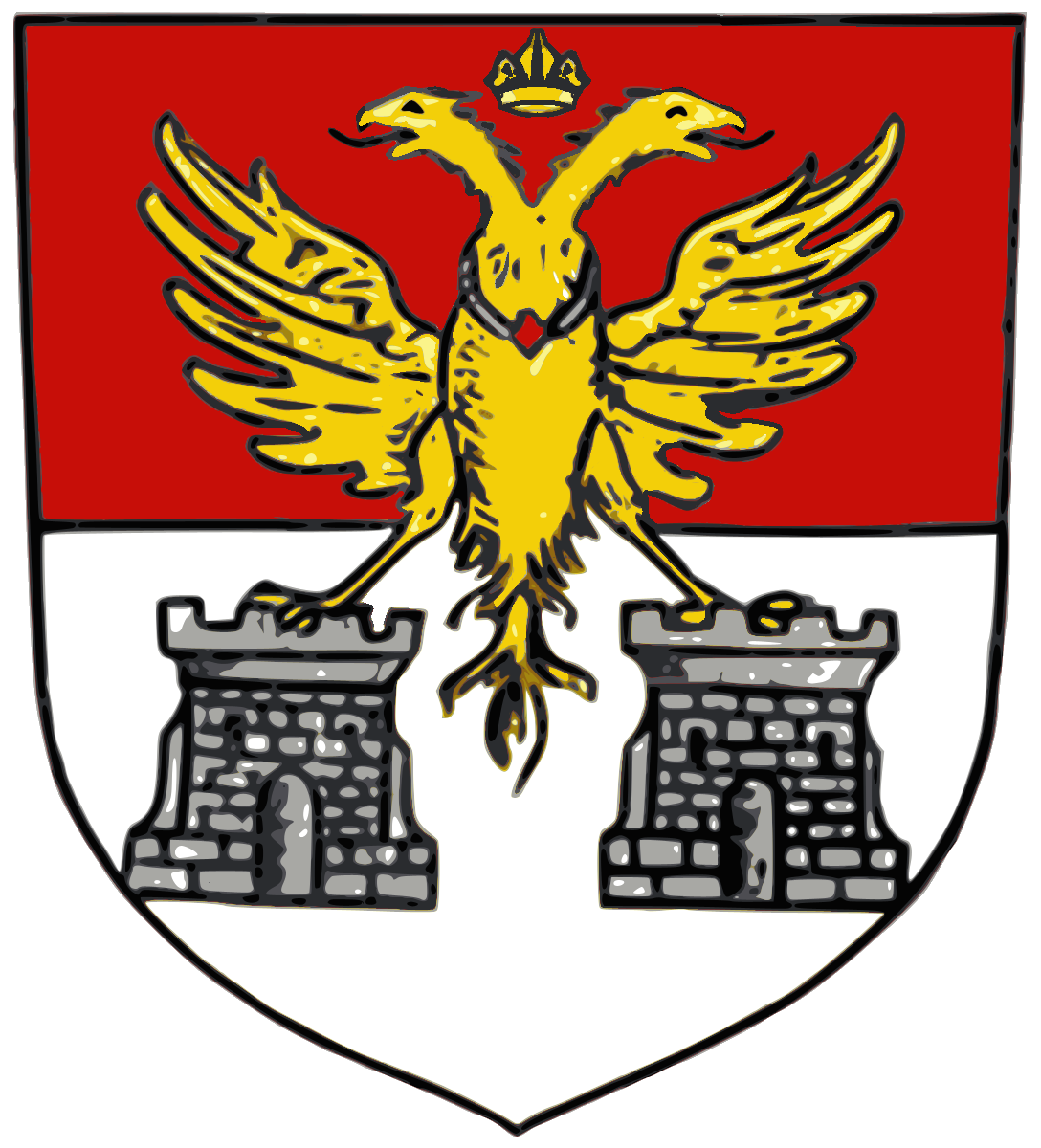
Coat of arms of Theodore Paleologus (d. 1636)

The Paleologus family in Pesaro, attested from the early 16th century onwards, claimed descent from 'John Palaiologos', a purported third son of Thomas Palaiologos. Their genealogy mainly derives from the tombstone of Theodore Paleologus (d. 1636), which lists Theodore's male-line ancestors five generations back, reaching Thomas. With the sole exception of Thomas's purported son John, the existence of the rest of Theodore's immediate ancestors can be verified through records at Pesaro. The earliest record of John's existence other than Theodore's tombstone are the writings of the Greek scholar Leo Allatius, who wrote in 1648, too late for his works to be considered independent evidence. Allatius was the keeper of the Vatican Library and would have had access to its vast collection of books and records and might have deduced his findings from there. As such, it is possible that Allatius had access to earlier documents, now lost, which would have proven the legitimacy of the Pesaro line. Allatius gives the sons of Thomas as "Andrea, Manuele and Ioanne". It would be difficult to explain why Allatius, a respected scholar, would simply make up a member of an ancient dynasty. The absence of any mentions of John Palaiologos in contemporary sources means that the Paleologus family's status as genuine male-line descendants of the last few Byzantine emperors can not be proven, but it is not impossible. None of their own contemporaries appear to have doubted their imperial descent.

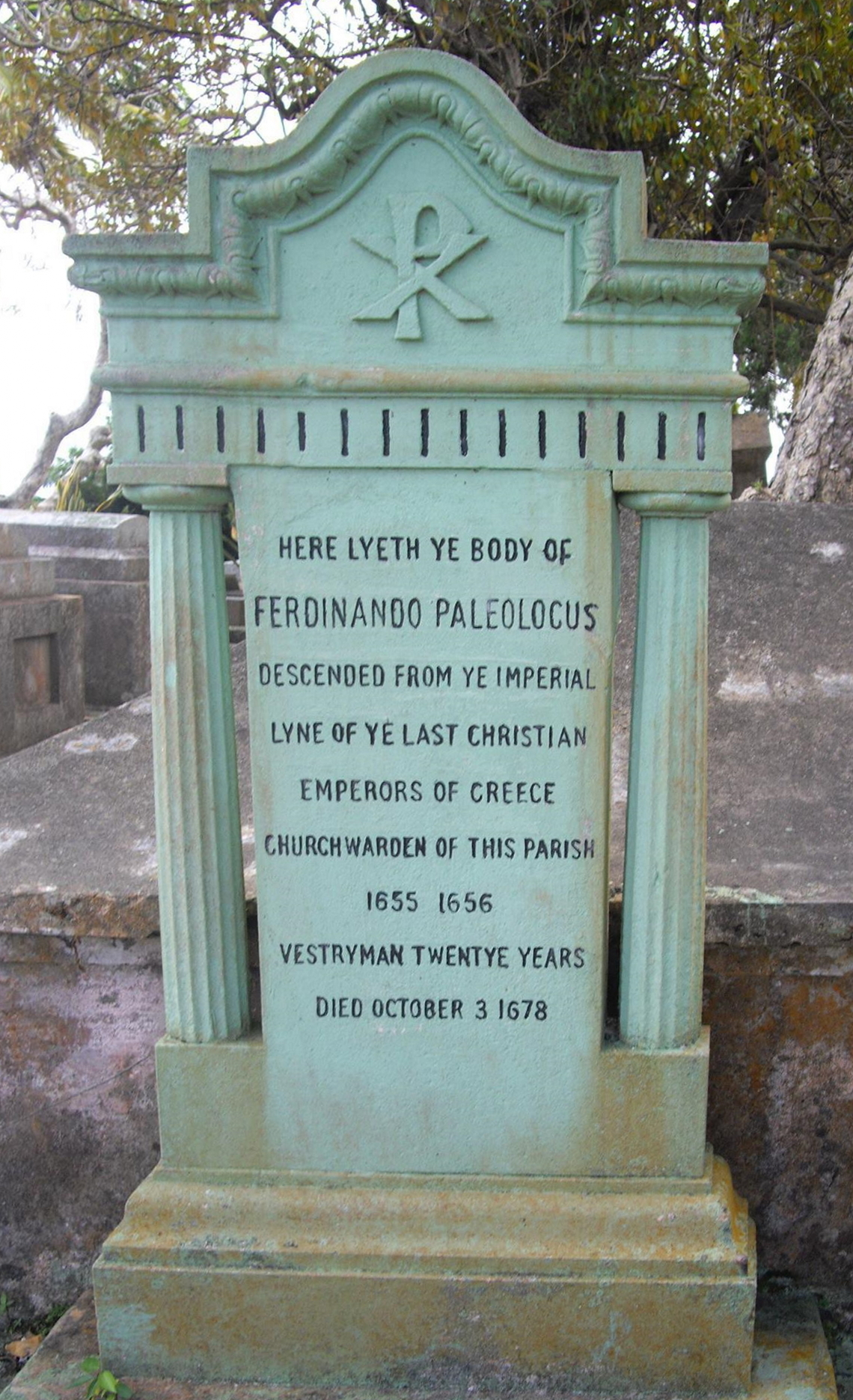
Tombstone of Ferdinand Paleologus (d. 1670) in Barbados

In 1578, the members of the family living in Pesaro were embroiled in a scandal as brothers Leonidas and Scipione Paleologus, and their nephew Theodore, were arrested for attempted murder. What happened to Scipione is not known, but Leonidas was executed. On account of his young age, Theodore was exiled from Pesaro rather than executed. Following his exile, Theodore established himself as an assassin and appears to have garnered an impressive reputation. In 1599, he entered into the service of Henry Clinton, the Earl of Lincoln, in England. Theodore lived in England for the rest of his life and fathered six children, whose fates were caught up in the English Civil War of 1642–1651. His son Ferdinand Paleologus, escaping the war, settled on the recently colonized island of Barbados in the Caribbean, where he became known as the "Greek prince from Cornwall" and owned a cotton or sugar plantation.

Ferdinand died in 1670 and was survived only by his son, Theodore. Theodore left Barbados to work as a privateer, serving aboard a ship called Charles II, and died at A Coruña, Spain in 1693. Theodore had a son, who probably predeceased him, and was survived only by a posthumous daughter, Godscall Paleologue, born in January 1694. Nothing is known of Godscall's life, the only record of her existence being her baptismal records. She was the last recorded member of the family and, if their claim to descend from the imperial dynasty was true, the last true heir of the Palaiologan emperors.

==== Paleologo of Venice ====
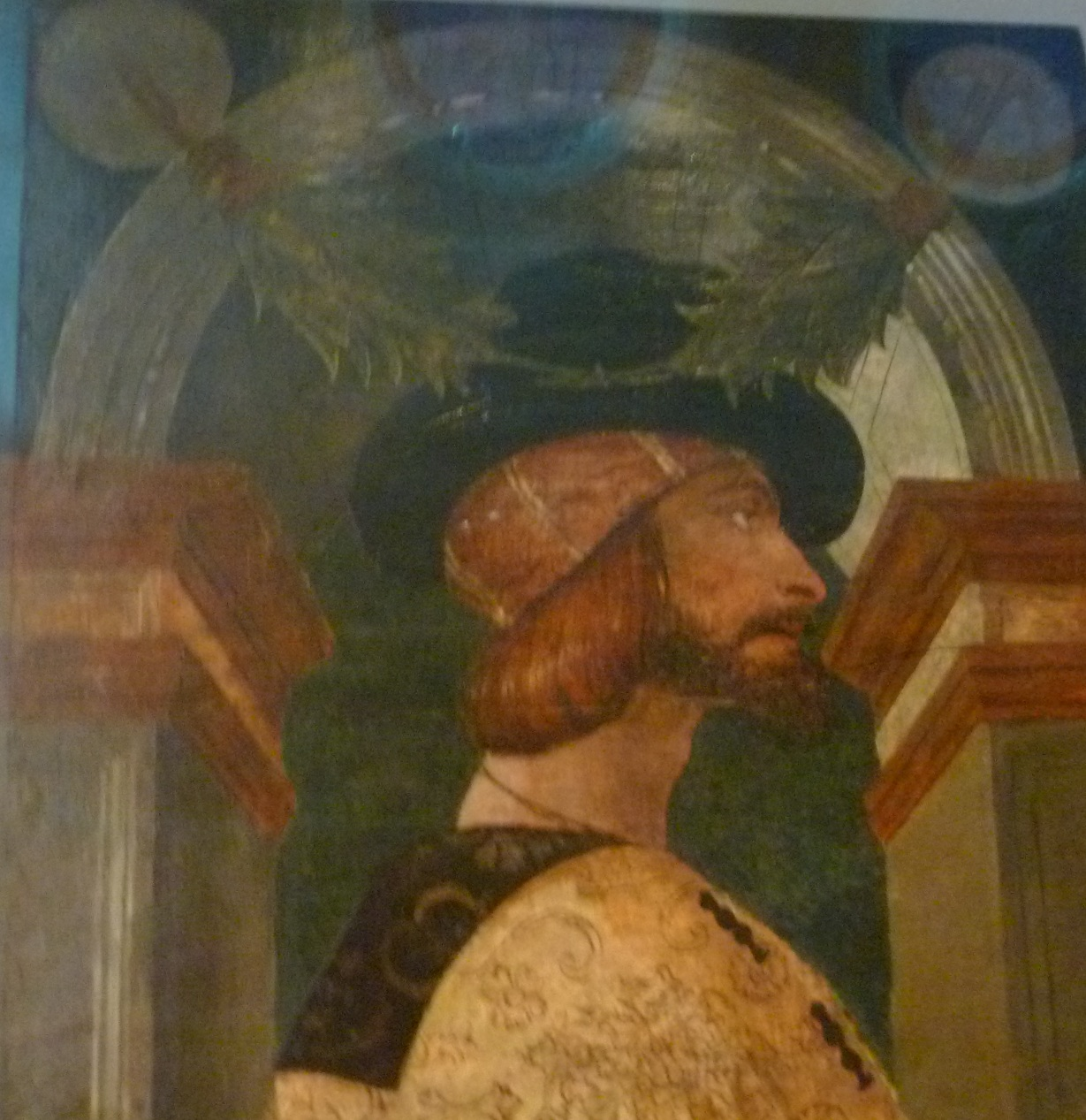
Possible portrait of Theodore Palaiologos (d. 1532), stratiote in the service of Venice

Because Venice was the only major non-Muslim power in the Eastern Mediterranean, it represented an appealing destination for Byzantine refugees as the empire fell. Numerous people with the last name Paleologus are recorded in Venice in the 15th and 16th centuries, many serving as stratioti (mercenary light-armed cavalrymen of Greek or Albanian origin). Venetian documents frequently refer to their "strenuous" prowess in service to the Venetian Republic. Venice had first become interested in hiring stratioti after witnessing the prowess of Greek and Albanian soldiers in the First Ottoman–Venetian War of 1463–1479.

The Venetian Palaiologoi were not related to the imperial family, but they might have been distant cousins. One of the earliest references to Palaiologoi in Venice is a 1479 Senate decision concerning Theodore Palaiologos, who had recently proven himself in a campaign in Friuli. Theodore had a well-documented career as a stratiote. Born in 1452, and probably originally from Mystras in the Morea, Theodore was originally a debt collector for the Ottomans in the Morea. In 1478, Theodore travelled to Venice with his father, Paul, and became a stratiote. For his merits in the service of Venice, Theodore was granted the island Cranae, though he later ceded it to another family. In 1495, Theodore partook in a siege of Novara and also partook in later battles in Savona and Cephalonia. Due to his knowledge of the Turkish language, Theodore also accompanied Venetian ambassadors in diplomatic missions to the Ottoman Empire, visiting Constantinople several times. He died in 1532, being buried in the Orthodox church of San Giorgio dei Greci.

Theodore had married Maria, a daughter of a man by the name Demetrios Kantakouzenos. That he could marry a genuine member of the noble Kantakouzenos family indicates that he held a certain noble status. Theodore was one of the key players in the Greek community in Venice, having helped the Greek refugees there achieve permission to construct the San Giorgio dei Greci church in the first place, and his family was highly regarded by the locals. Theodore's descendants and relatives lived on in Venice and its territories long after his death. His nephew, Zuanne Paleologo, and two of Zuanne's sons, died on Cyprus, fighting the Ottomans during the 1570 Siege of Nicosia in the Fourth Ottoman–Venetian War. The 1570 will of Demetri Paleologo, a son of Theodore, begins with "Io Demetri Palleollogo, da Constantinopoli ...". Over a century had passed since Constantinople, a city Demetri had never seen, had fallen and yet he retained lingering dreams of the city.

A man by the name Andrea Paleologo Graitzas, attested in Venice in 1460, supposedly has living descendants, with numerous people with the last name Palaiologos (or variations thereof) living in Athens today claiming to descend from him.

==== In the Ottoman Empire ====
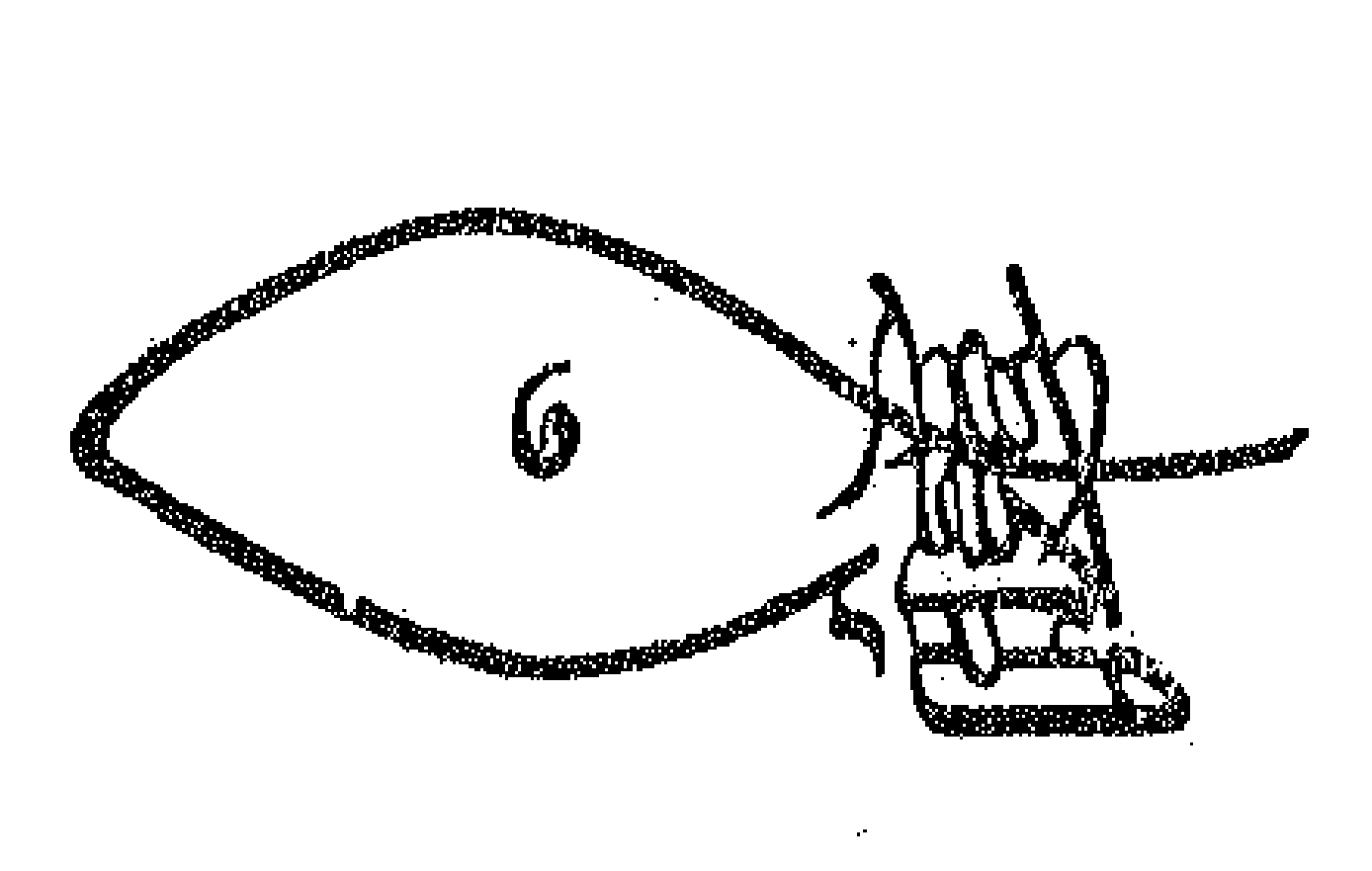
Signature of Hass Murad Pasha, an Ottoman statesman and possibly illegitimate son of one of Constantine XI's brothers

Some nobles with the last name Palaiologos remained in Ottoman Constantinople, and even prospered in the immediate post-conquest period. In the decades after 1453, Ottoman tax registers show a consortium of noble Greeks co-operating to bid for the lucrative tax farming district including Constantinople and the ports of western Anatolia. This group included names like "Palologoz of Kassandros" and "Manuel Palologoz". This group stood in close contact with two powerful viziers, Mesih Pasha and Hass Murad Pasha, both of whom were reportedly nephews to Constantine XI Palaiologos and had been forced to convert to Islam after Constantinople's fall, as well as with other converted scions of Byzantine and Balkan aristocratic families like Mahmud Pasha Angelović, forming what the Ottomanist Halil İnalcık termed a "Greek faction" at the court of Mehmed II.

==== Other claims of descent ====
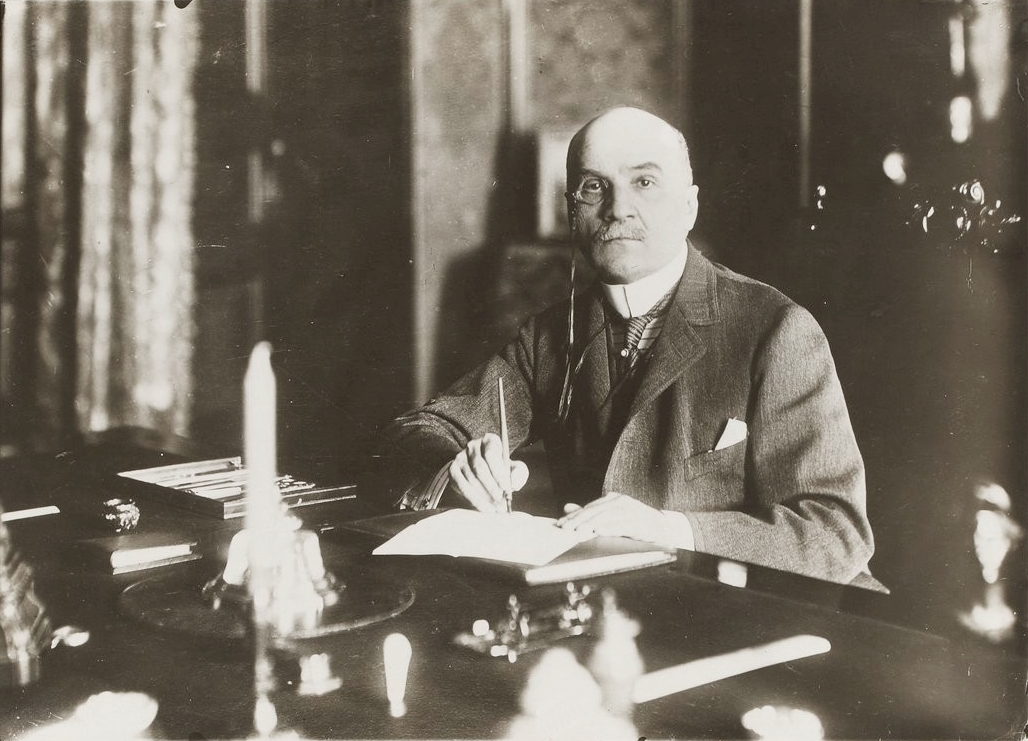
Maurice Paléologue (d. 1944), a French diplomat of Romanian origin who claimed descent from the Palaiologos dynasty

Numerous people with the last name Palaiologos, living on the island of Syros in Greece, have historically claimed descent from a supposed son of Andronikos Palaiologos, one of Emperor Manuel II's sons and Despot of Thessaloniki. Their descent is questionable since there is no surviving contemporary evidence that Andronikos had children. That Andronikos suffered from elephantiasis and epilepsy, and that he died at a young age, makes it unlikely that he married and had a son.

Another family which claims to descend from the old imperial dynasty are the Paleologu of Romania, claiming to be the descendants of an otherwise unattested son of Theodore II Palaiologos, Despot of the Morea, called Emanuel Petrus (Manuel Petros in Greek). The Paleologu also live in Malta and France, one of the most famous members of the family being the French diplomat Maurice Paléologue, who in his lifetime repeatedly asserted his imperial descent. The ancestry of the Paleologu can be traced to Greeks with the name Palaiologos, but not to the imperial family. In the 18th century, several Phanariots (members of prominent Greek families in the Fener quarter of Constantinople) were granted governing positions in the principalities of Wallachia and Moldavia (predecessors of Romania) by the Ottomans. The Phanariots sent to Wallachia and Moldavia included people with the last name Palaiologos, ancestors of the Paleologu family.

Some Italian genealogies from the 17th century onwards ascribe further sons to Thomas Palaiologos, in addition to both Andreas, Manuel and the unverified John. Notably, these include a supposed older son called Rogerio or Ruggerio, supposedly born around 1430 and sent as a hostage to Alfonso the Magnanimous of Aragon and Naples. Supposedly, Rogerio was responsible for erecting the Spirito Santo church, which still stands, in Casalsottano, a hamlet of the Italian comune San Mauro Cilento. Rogerio was supposedly survived by his two children John (Giovanni) and Angela. Giovanni was supposedly granted Perito and Ostigliano in Salerno and his descendants adopted the name Paleologo Mastrogiovanni (or just Mastrogiovanni) in his honour. The Paleologo Mastrogiovanni family is an extant family in Italy, but their claimed family history mainly derives from oral tradition, with few documents supporting it. None of the documents have been authenticated and there are several issues with the overall reconstruction of events and descent. Modern researchers overwhelmingly dismiss the existence of Rogerio as fantasy, given his clearly Italian first name, the unlikelihood of a potential imperial heir being kept as a hostage in Italy and that there are no mentions of such a figure in Byzantine records. The contemporary historian George Sphrantzes, who described the life of Thomas Palaiologos in detail, wrote on the birth of Andreas Palaiologos on 17 January 1453 that the boy was "a continuator and heir" of the Palaiologan lineage, a phrase which makes little sense if Andreas was not Thomas's first-born son.

== Legacy ==
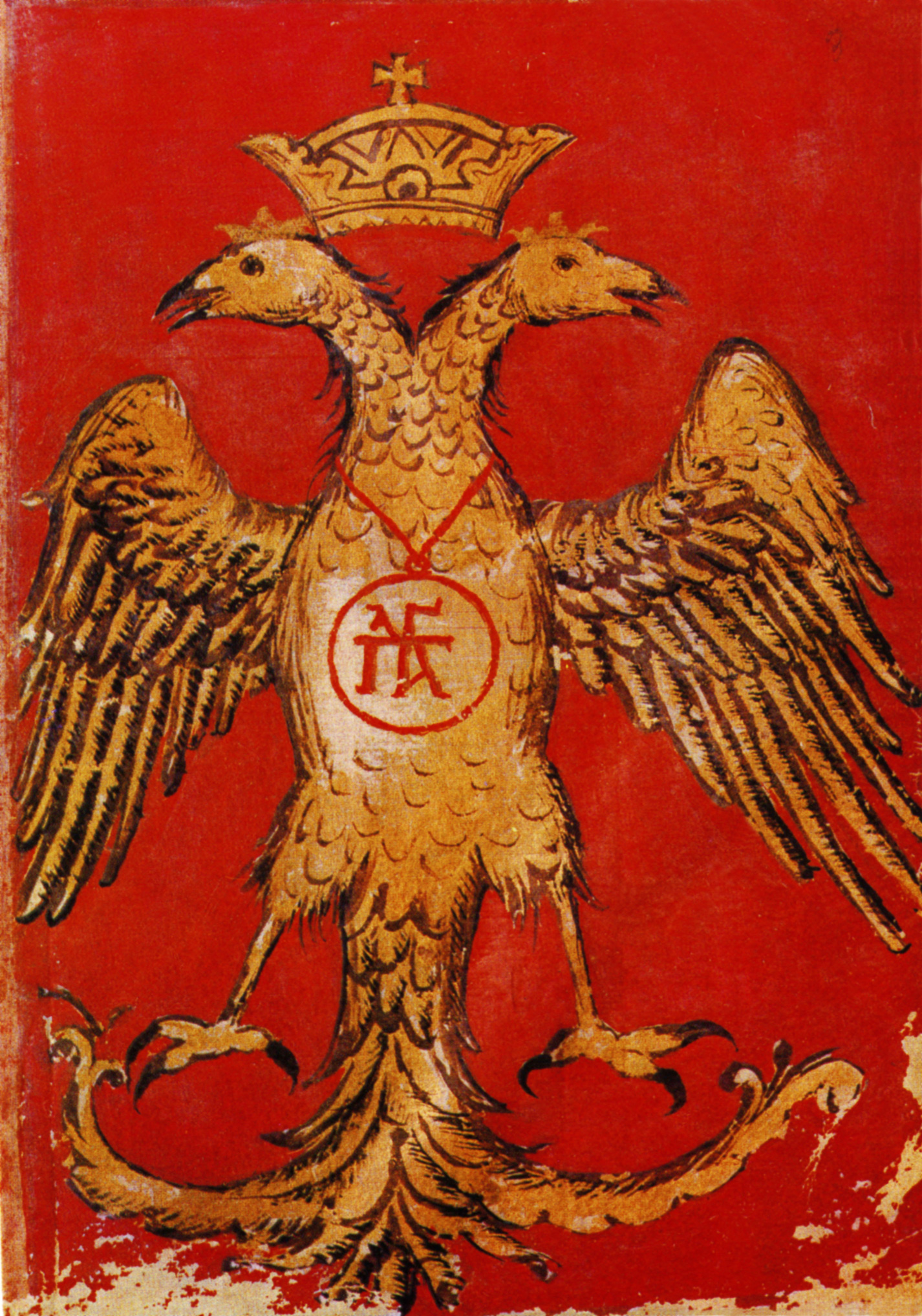
15th-century miniature of a double-headed eagle with the family cypher (sympilema) of Palaiologos: ΠΑΛΓ

During most of their tenure as Byzantine emperors, the Palaiologan dynasty was not well-liked by their subjects. Not only were the means the family had used to gain the throne grim, but their religious policy alienated many within the empire. The Palaiologan emperors aspired to reunite the Eastern Orthodox Church with the Catholic Church of Rome, to ensure legitimacy in the eyes of the West and in an attempt to secure aid against the many enemies of their empire. Michael VIII succeeded in a union at the Second Council of Lyons in 1274, which formally reunited the churches after more than two centuries of schism. Michael VIII was taunted with the words "you have become a Frank", which remains a term in Greek to taunt converts to Catholicism to this day. The union was passionately opposed by the Byzantine people and of Byzantine rulers not actually under Michael VIII's control, such as John II Megas Komnenos, Emperor of Trebizond, and Nikephoros I Komnenos Doukas, the ruler of Epirus. Despite Michael VIII's efforts, the union was disrupted in 1281, after just seven years, when he was excommunicated by Pope Martin IV. When Michael VIII died in 1282 he died condemned as a traitor and a heretic by his people, who saw him as someone who had bullied them into submission under the Church of Rome. He was denied the traditional funeral pomps of an Orthodox Emperor.

Though Michael's successor Andronikos II quickly repudiated the Union of the Churches, many of the Palaiologan emperors worked to ensure its restoration. As the Ottoman Empire grew to encompass more and more Byzantine territory, emperors such as John V and Manuel II labored intensely to restore the union, much to the dismay of their subjects. At the Council of Florence in 1439, Emperor John VIII reaffirmed the Union in the light of imminent Turkish attacks on what little remained of his empire. To the Byzantine citizens themselves, the Union of the Churches, which to John VIII served as an assurance of a great western crusade against the Ottomans, was a death warrant for their empire. John VIII had betrayed their faith and as such their entire imperial ideology and world view. The promised crusade, the fruit of John VIII's labor, ended only in disaster as it was defeated by the Turks at the Battle of Varna in 1444. In 1798, the Greek Orthodox Patriarch of Jerusalem, Anthemus, wrote that the Ottoman Empire had been imposed by God himself as the supreme empire on Earth due to the heretical dealings of the Palaiologan emperors with Christians in the West.

Behold how our merciful and omniscient Lord has managed to preserve the integrity of our holy Orthodox faith and to save (us) all; he brought forth out of nothing the powerful Empire of the Ottomans, which he set up in the place of our Empire of the Romaioi, which had begun in some ways to deviate from the path of the Orthodox faith; and he raised this Empire of the Ottomans above every other in order to prove beyond doubt that it came into being by the will of God .... For there is no authority except that deriving from God.

— Anthemus of Jerusalem, 1798

There is no evidence that the final emperor, Constantine XI, ever repudiated the union achieved at Florence in 1439. Many of his subjects had chastised him as a traitor and heretic while he lived and he, like many of his predecessors before him, died in communion with the Church of Rome. Nevertheless, Constantine's actions during the Fall of Constantinople and his death fighting the Turks redeemed the popular view of the Palaiologan dynasty. The Greeks forgot or ignored that Constantine had died a "heretic", many considering him a martyr. In the eyes of the Orthodox church, Constantine's death sanctified him and he died a hero. As Ottoman rule continued, many Greeks dreamed of a day when a new emperor would once more rule a sizeable Greek domain. Some even believed that Constantine XI would return to rescue them, that he was not actually dead but merely asleep, awaiting a call from the heavens to return and restore Christian control over Constantinople.

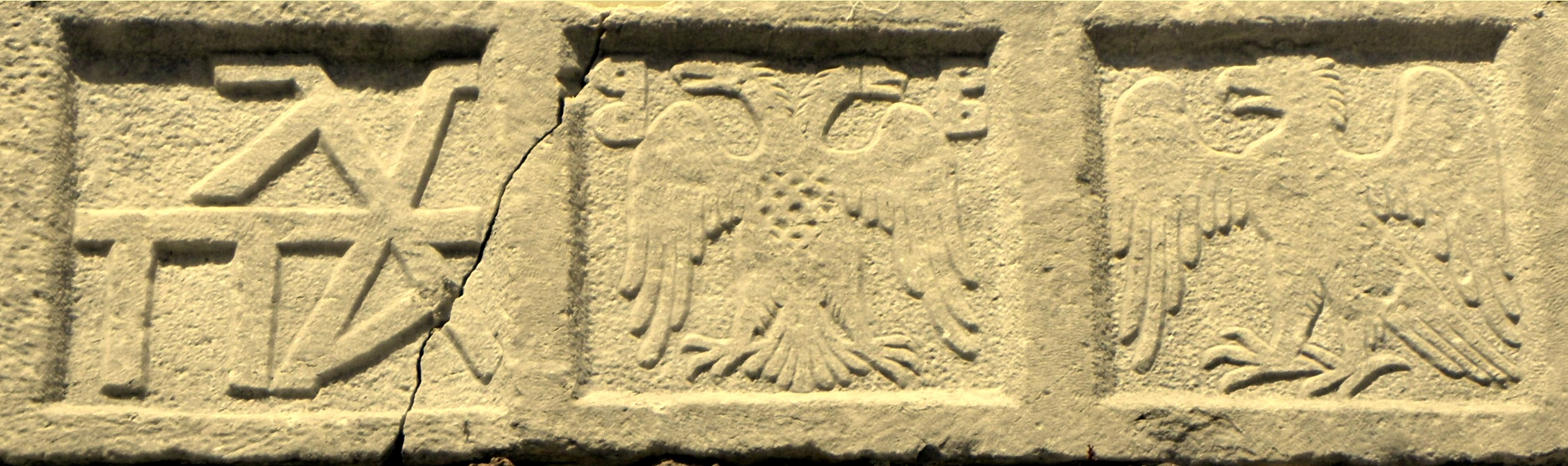
Wall engraving from the Castle of Mytilene depicting the Palaiologos cypher and a double-headed eagle

Beyond Constantine's martyrdom, the Palaiologos dynasty had a lasting impact on the Greeks throughout the centuries of Ottoman rule, having been the last family to govern independent Greek lands. As late as the 19th century, after the Greek War of Independence had resulted in the creation of a new independent Greek state, the provisional government of liberated Greece sent a delegation to Western Europe in search of possible descendants of those imperial Palaiologoi that had escaped into exile. The delegation visited places in Italy where Palaiologoi were known to have resided and even came to Cornwall, where Theodore Paleologus had lived in the 17th century. Local tradition on Barbados has it that the delegation also sent a letter to the authorities on Barbados, inquiring if descendants of Ferdinand Paleologus still lived on the island. The letter supposedly requested that if that was the case, the head of the family should be provided with the means of returning to Greece, with the trip paid for by the Greek government. Ultimately, the delegation's search was in vain and they found no living embodiments of their lost empire.

== Family tree ==
In order to conserve space, the family tree focuses on people of male-line descent, omitting many children and descendants of female members of the dynasty. Most marriages that did not produce children are also omitted. Emperors are indicated with bold text and women are indicated with italics. Dotted lines indicate illegitimate offspring. Family trees for related families (i.e. Doukas, Komnenos, Angelos, Kantakouzenos etc.) simplified, with multiple figures omitted, see their articles for more detailed charts. The family tree only follows the imperial branch of the family.

Palaiologos family

John Doukas d. 1088 | Constantine X Doukas; 1006–1067
Nikephoros Palaiologos d. 1081 | Andronikos Doukas d. 1077
George Palaiologos | Anna Doukaina | Irene Doukaina c. 1066–1138 | Alexios I Komnenos; 1048–1118 | Adrianos Komnenos c. 1060/1065–1118/36 | Zoe Doukaina
Nikephoros Palaiologos | Michael Palaiologos | Constantine Angelos c. 1093–1166 | Theodora Komnene b. 1096 | Andronikos Palaiologos c. 1083/85–1115/18 | ? Komnene | Alexios Palaiologos | Anna Komnene
Andronikos Angelos c. 1133–1183/85
Michael Palaiologos | Alexios III Angelos c. 1153–1211 | George Palaiologos c. 1125–1167/68 | Constantine Palaiologos fl. 1157–1166 | ? Palaiologina
Alexios Palaiologos | Irene Komnene | Irene Angelina | Alexios Palaiologos d. 1203 | Andronikos Palaiologos | ? Palaiologina
Michael Palaiologos | Andronikos Palaiologos c. 1190–1248/1250 | Theodora Palaiologina
Nikephoros Tarchaneiotes | Maria Palaiologina b. 1216 | John Kantakouzenos | Irene Palaiologina c. 1218–1284 | Michael VIII Palaiologos; 1224/1225–1282 | Theodora Vatatzaina c. 1240–1303 | John Palaiologos; 1225/30–1274
(Issue) | (Issue)
Ivan Asen III of Bulgaria; 1259/1260–1303 | Irene Palaiologina d. c. 1302 | Anna of Hungary c. 1260–1281 | Andronikos II Palaiologos; 1259–1332 | Yolande of Montferrat c. 1274–1317 | 6 more children (Note: Michael VIII and Theodora also had the sons Manuel Palaiologos (c. 1255–before 1259; died young), Constantine Palaiologos (1261–1306; who had a son, John Palaiologos, and a granddaughter, Maria Palaiologina, ancestral to the later members of the Nemanjić dynasty of Serbia) and Theodore Palaiologos (c. 1263–after 1310). The couple also had three more daughters; Anna Palaiologina (c. 1260–1299/1300; married Demetrios Doukas Komnenos Koutroules), Theodora Palaiologina (married David VI of Georgia) and Eudokia Palaiologina (married John II of Trebizond). Michael also had two illegitimate daughters by his mistress of the Diplovatatzina family: Euphrosyne Palaiologina (married Nogai Khan) and Maria Palaiologina (married Abaqa Khan).)
(Issue) (Note: Irene was ancestral to many of the later members of the Asen family. Her descendants assumed the name Asen Palaiologos.) | Andronikos Asen d. 1322 | Michael IX Palaiologos; 1277–1320 | Rita of Armenia; 1278–1333 | Constantine Palaiologos; 1278/81–1334/35 | 7 children (Note: With Yolande of Montferrat, Andronikos II had the sons John Palaiologos (1286–1307), Bartholomaios Palaiologos (b. 1289; died young), Theodore Palaiologos (c. 1290–1338; founder of the House of Palaeologus-Montferrat and ancestor to that family), Demetrios Palaiologos (c. 1297 – after 1343; father of Empress Irene Palaiologina) and Isaac Palaiologos (born 1299; died young). The couple also had the two daughters Simonis Palaiologina (c. 1294 – after 1336) and Theodora Palaiologina (born 1295; died young). In addition to these children, Andronikos II also had three illegitimate daughters; Irene (wife of John II Doukas of Thessaly), Maria (wife of Toqta) and a daughter who married Öljaitü.)
Irene Asanina | John VI Kantakouzenos; 1292–1383 | Andronikos III Palaiologos; 1297–1341 | Anna of Savoy; 1306–1365 | Manuel Palaiologos d. 1320 | Anna Palaiologina d. 1320 | Theodora Palaiologina fl. 1308–1330
Sultan Orhan c. 1281–1362 | Theodora Kantakouzene c. 1330–1396 | Irene Palaiologina c. 1315–1341 | Helena Kantakouzene; 1333–1396 | John V Palaiologos; 1332–1391 | Maria Palaiologina d. 1384/1401 | Francesco I Gattilusio ?–1384 | Michael Palaiologos c. 1337–1370 | Irene Palaiologina c. 1327–1399
(Issue) (Note: Maria was ancestral to later members of the Gattilusio family and their descendants. She was the grandmother of Irene Gattilusio, who married her grandnephew John VII Palaiologos.)
Andronikos IV Palaiologos; 1348–1385 | Keratsa of Bulgaria; 1348–1390 | Şehzade Halil c. 1346–1362 | Irene Palaiologina b. 1349 | Helena Dragaš c. 1372–1450 | Manuel II Palaiologos; 1350–1425 | Theodore Palaiologos c. 1355–1407 | Michael Palaiologos d. 1376/77
John VII Palaiologos; 1370–1408 | Irene Gattilusio d. 1440 | John VIII Palaiologos; 1392–1448 | Theodore Palaiologos c. 1394/99–1448 | Cleofa Malatesta d. 1433 | Andronikos Palaiologos; 1400–1428 | Constantine XI Palaiologos; 1405–1453 | Demetrios Palaiologos; 1407–1470 | Theodora Asanina d. 1470 | Thomas Palaiologos; 1409–1465 | Catherine Zaccaria d. 1462 | 3–4 more children (Note: Sons Constantine Palaiologos (c. 1393/8 to before 1405) and Michael Palaiologos(1406/7–1409/10), both of whom died young, and 1–2 daughters.)
Andronikos V Palaiologos; 1400–1407 | John II of Cyprus; 1418–1458 | Helena Palaiologina; 1428–1458 | Helena Palaiologina; 1442–1469 | Helena Palaiologina; 1431–1473 | Lazar Branković c. 1421–1458 | Zoe Palaiologina; 1448/1451–1503 | Ivan III of Russia; 1440–1505 | Andreas Palaiologos; 1453–1502 | Manuel Palaiologos c. 1455–1512
(Issue) (Note: Two daughters, Charlotte of Cyprus and Cleopha de Lusignan. Cleopha died in infancy and Helena's line died out with Charlotte in 1487.) | (Issue) (Note: Helena was ancestral to numerous Italian families, notably the Tocco family, which went extinct in 1884, and their descendants.) | (Issue) (Note: Zoe was ancestral to the later Rurik dynasty. Ivan the Terrible was Zoe's grandson. The later Romanov dynasty were not her descendants, originating as in-laws rather than descendants of the Rurikids.) | Andreas Palaiologos fl. 1520 | John Palaiologos d. young

== See also ==
- History of the Byzantine Empire
- Family tree of Byzantine emperors
- Byzantine literature of the Laskaris and Palaiologos periods

== Notes ==
— Imperial house — Palaiologos Founding year: 11th century Dissolution: 16th century
| Preceded by Laskaris | Ruling House of the Byzantine Empire; 1259–1453 | Fall of the Byzantine Empire (Ottoman Empire; House of Osman) |
| Preceded by Kantakouzenos | Ruling House of the Despotate of the Morea; 1383–1460 | Fall of the Byzantine Empire (Ottoman Empire; House of Osman) |
| Preceded by House of Aleramici | Ruling House of the March of Montferrat; 1306–1533 | Succeeded by House of Gonzaga |
