= Paleologu =

Paleologu may refer to:

- Alexandru Paleologu, Wallachian 1848 revolutionary, father of Maurice Paléologue
- Alexandru Paleologu (1919–2005), Romanian writer and diplomat
- Jean de Paleologu (1855–1942), Romanian poster artist and painter
- Theodor Paleologu (born 1973), Romanian historian and diplomat, son of Alexandru
- Palaiologos, Byzantine Greek family
- Albești-Paleologu, a commune in Prahova County, Romania
