= Flaminio Paleologo =

Italian soldier (1518–1571)

Flaminio Paleologo (1518, Casale Monferrato – May 24, 1571, Goito) was an Italian soldier and feudal lord. He was an illegitimate son of John George Palaeologus and his unknown mistress. He was killed by poisoning in 1571 for rebelling against the Guglielmo Gonzaga, Duke of Mantua.

== Marriage and children ==
Flaminio Paleologo was married to Lucina della Torre and had 7 known children:

- Theodore
- John (Giovanni)
- Laura
- Margaret
- Isabella
- Eleonora
- Ferdinand

== Sources ==
- Turchi, Laura (2014). "Paleologo, Flaminio". Dizionario Biografico degli Italiani, Volume 80: Ottone–Pansa (in Italian). Rome: Istituto dell'Enciclopedia Italiana. ISBN 978-8-81200032-6.
