= Eleonora Gonzaga (born 1598) =

Holy Roman Empress from 1622 to 1637

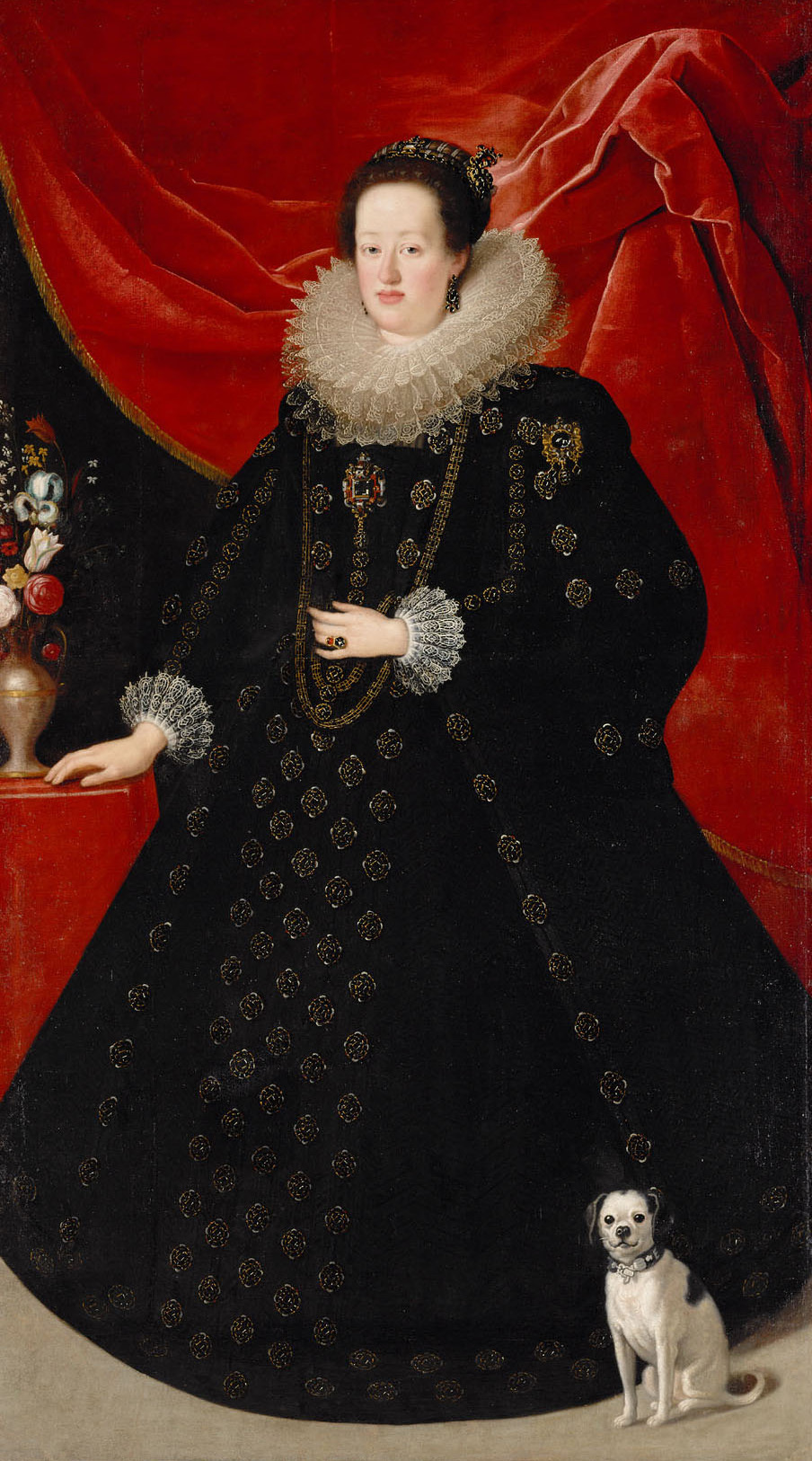
- Portrait by Justus Sustermans, c. 1623/24

Holy Roman Empress
- Tenure: 2 February 1622 – 15 February 1637
- Coronation: 7 November 1627
- Born: 23 September 1598; Mantua, Duchy of Mantua
- Died: 27 June 1655 (aged 56); Vienna, Archduchy of Austria
- Burial: St. Stephen's Cathedral (body; since 1782); Mausoleum in Graz (heart)
- Spouse: Ferdinand II, Holy Roman Emperor (m. 1622; died 1637)
- House: Gonzaga
- Father: Vincenzo Gonzaga, Duke of Mantua
- Mother: Eleonora de' Medici

Eleonora Gonzaga (23 September 1598 – 27 June 1655) was born a princess of Mantua as a member of the House of Gonzaga, and by marriage to Ferdinand II, Holy Roman Emperor, was Holy Roman Empress, German Queen, Queen of Hungary and Bohemia.

Nicknamed the Elder (German: Ältere) to distinguish herself from her namesake great-niece, during her tenure, the Imperial court in Vienna became one of the centers of European Baroque music. As empress, Eleanora was a supporter of the Counter-Reformation.

== Life ==
=== Early years ===
Eleonora was born in Mantua on 23 September 1598, as the youngest child of Vincenzo I Gonzaga, Duke of Mantua and Monferrat, and his wife and first cousin, Eleanor de' Medici. On her father's side her grandparents were Guglielmo Gonzaga, Duke of Mantua and Montferrat and his wife Archduchess Eleanor of Austria, and on her mother's side her grandparents were Francesco I de' Medici, Grand Duke of Tuscany and his first wife Archduchess Joanna of Austria.

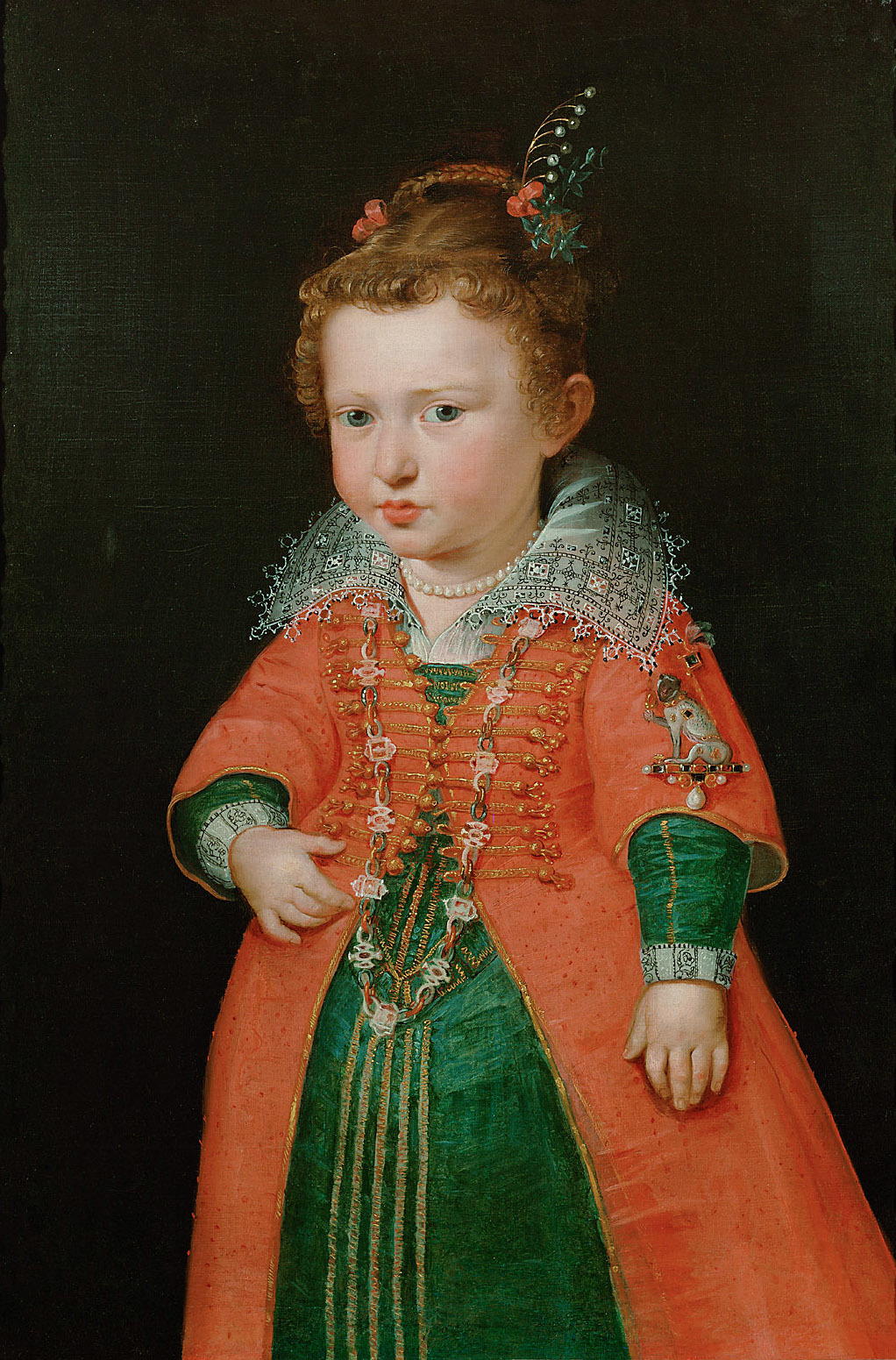
Eleonora as a child, c. 1600/01, probably by Peter Paul Rubens. Kunsthistorisches Museum, Vienna.

Two months after her birth, on 22 November, the princess was baptized at the Basilica palatina di Santa Barbara with the names Eleonora Anna Maria, in honor of her mother and her two surviving full-siblings, Anna de' Medici (who died in 1584 aged 14) and Marie de' Medici, future Queen consort of France and Navarre. The ceremony was conducted by Francesco, Bishop of Mantua (born Prince Annibale Gonzaga, from the Gazzuolo branch), and her godparents were Ferdinand II, Archduke of Inner Austria (her future husband as Holy Roman Emperor)—who was represented by Jakob Prandtner—and Margaret of Austria, Queen of Spain.

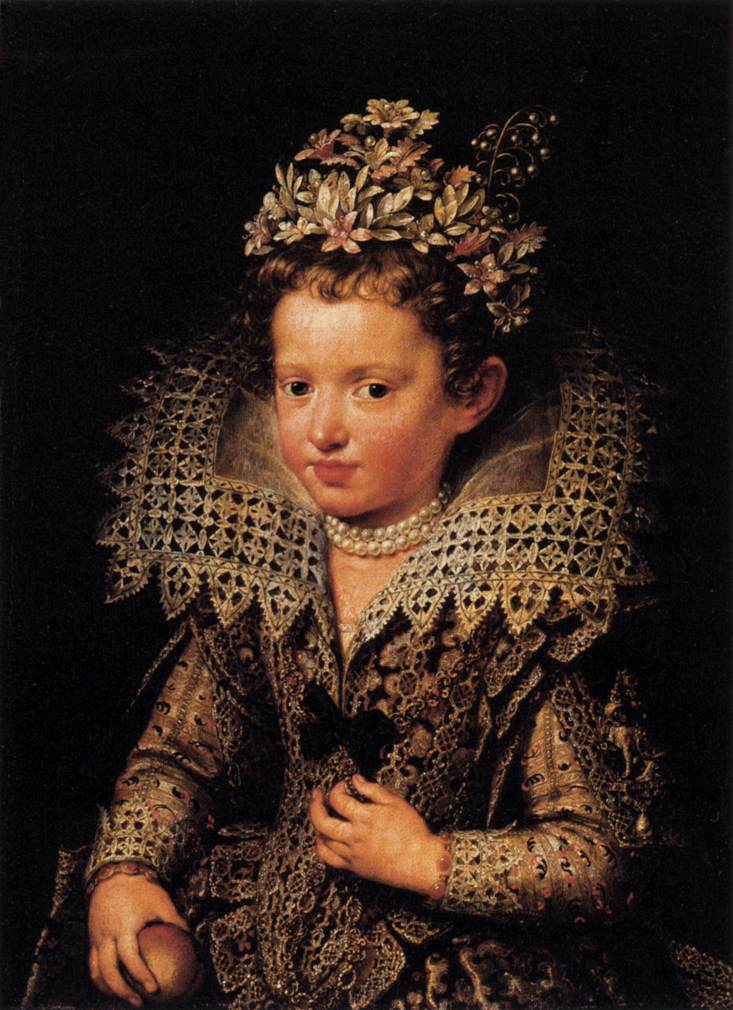
Eleonora as a child, by Frans Pourbus the Younger, c. 1605. Palazzo Pitti, Florence.

Eleonora spent her childhood at the ducal court in Mantua, which was one of the centers of European culture and science. When she was ten, her education was entrusted to her paternal aunt Margherita Gonzaga, Dowager Duchess of Ferrara and Modena, who, although she never took the veil, lived in a Clarissan monastery attached to the Church of Sant'Orsola, founded by herself. The dowager duchess saw to it that her niece received a good education, which included learning foreign languages, history, music and painting. The religious environment in which she grew up greatly influenced Eleonora, and was expressed in deeds of piety and charity.

In early 1610, Duke Vincenzo negotiated a marriage between his 12-year-old daughter and Marcantonio IV Colonna, Duke and Prince of Paliano, and in March of that year a contract was signed under which a dowry was stipulated for Eleonora of 130,000 scudi. However, the negotiations quickly ended because of a previous marriage agreement of the Colonnas with the Doria family. Then, negotiations began for the marriage of Eleonora with Victor Amadeus, Prince of Piedmont and heir of the Duchy of Savoy; however, the intended groom expected a large territorial gain as a dowry, which the House of Gonzaga refused. Duke Vincenzo died in 1612, before he could arrange his youngest daughter's marriage.

=== Marriage ===
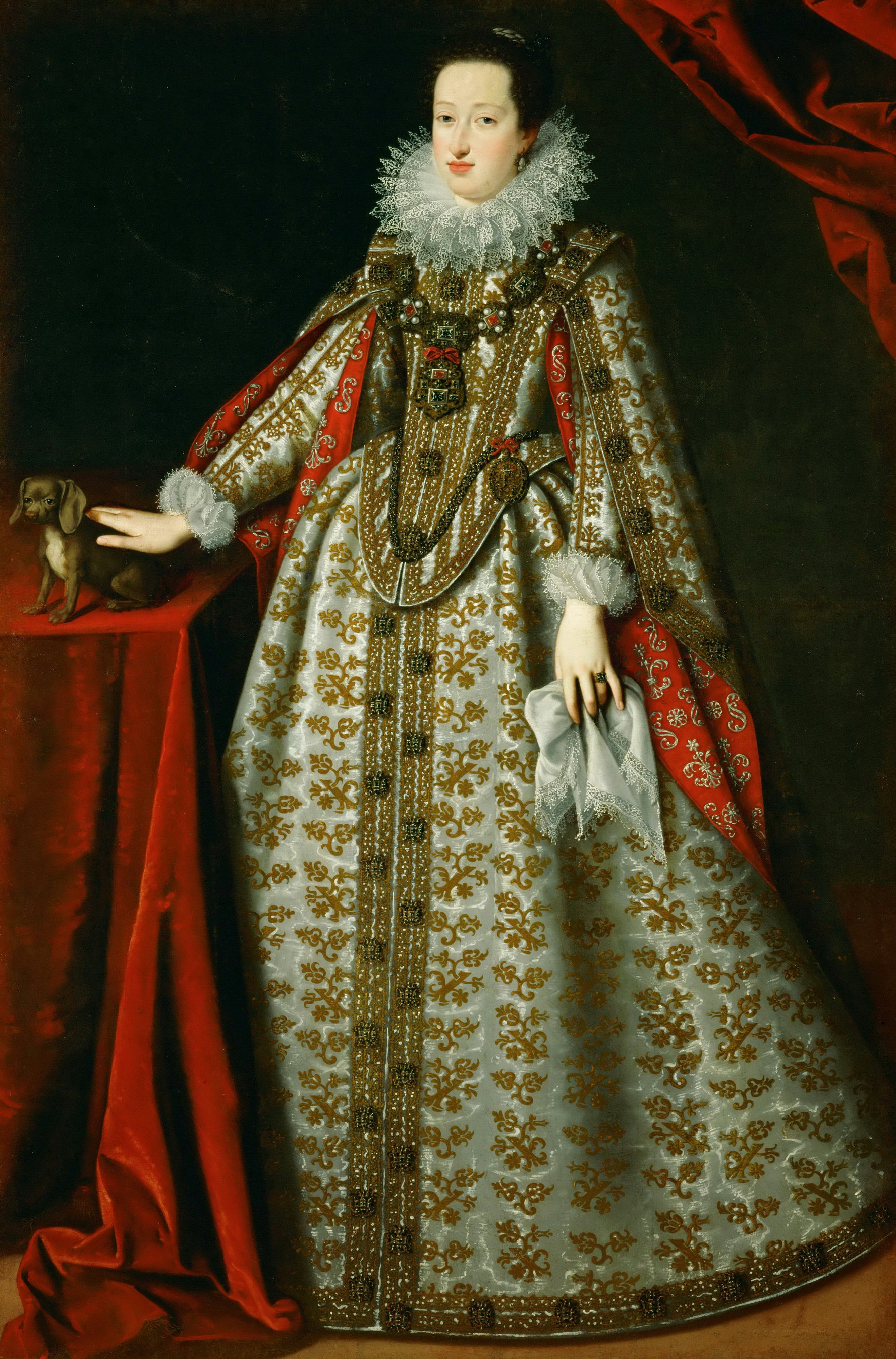
Eleonora in her wedding dress, by Justus Sustermans, 1621/22. Kunsthistorisches Museum, Vienna.

In July 1621 the widowed Holy Roman Emperor Ferdinand II sent his Privy Councillor Prince Hans Ulrich von Eggenberg to Mantua, instructing him to negotiate his marriage with Eleonora. After obtaining the dispensation of the Holy See for the Emperor's wedding with not only a relative (ratione consanguinitatis) but also his goddaughter (ratione affinitatis spiritualis ex baptismo contractae), on 21 November the contract was signed, which repeated the provisions made by Ferdinand II's first wife, and on the same day in the Basilica palatina di Santa Barbara at the Ducal Palace, Mantua the marriage per procura was concluded.

The official wedding ceremony took place in Innsbruck on 2 February 1622 and celebrations were quite modest. Ferdinand II and Eleonora, who were accompanied by relatives, were married in the chapel of the imperial palace. As a wedding gift from the groom, the bride received jewelry made of diamonds and pearls worth 30,000 ducats; in addition, 18,000 florins were presented to Eleonora by the Tyrolean subjects of her husband. Two days after the wedding the newlyweds and guests took part in a liturgy at the convent of the Servants of Mary, Religious Sisters of the Servite Third Order in honor of the foundress, sister Anna Juliana Gonzaga, Dowager Archduchess-Countess of Tyrol (another Eleonora's aunt), who died a year before. Two days later, Eleonora's relatives received gifts from the Emperor and left for Mantua, and the next day the Imperial couple went to Vienna.

In spite of the great age difference between them, Eleonora and Ferdinand II had a happy marriage. They had no children, but Eleonora was able to develop a close relationship with all her stepchildren, particularly with the youngest one, the Archduke Leopold Wilhelm, in whom she formed a taste for art and literature. Like her husband, she was deeply religious and a strong supporter of the Counter-Reformation, being a benefactress of churches and monasteries and taking great interest in matters of charity. The confessors of the emperor and empress were Jesuits. Eleonora and her husband also shared a love for hunting and music; some time later, the emperor amended the marriage contract in favor of his wife.

=== Holy Roman Empress and German Queen ===
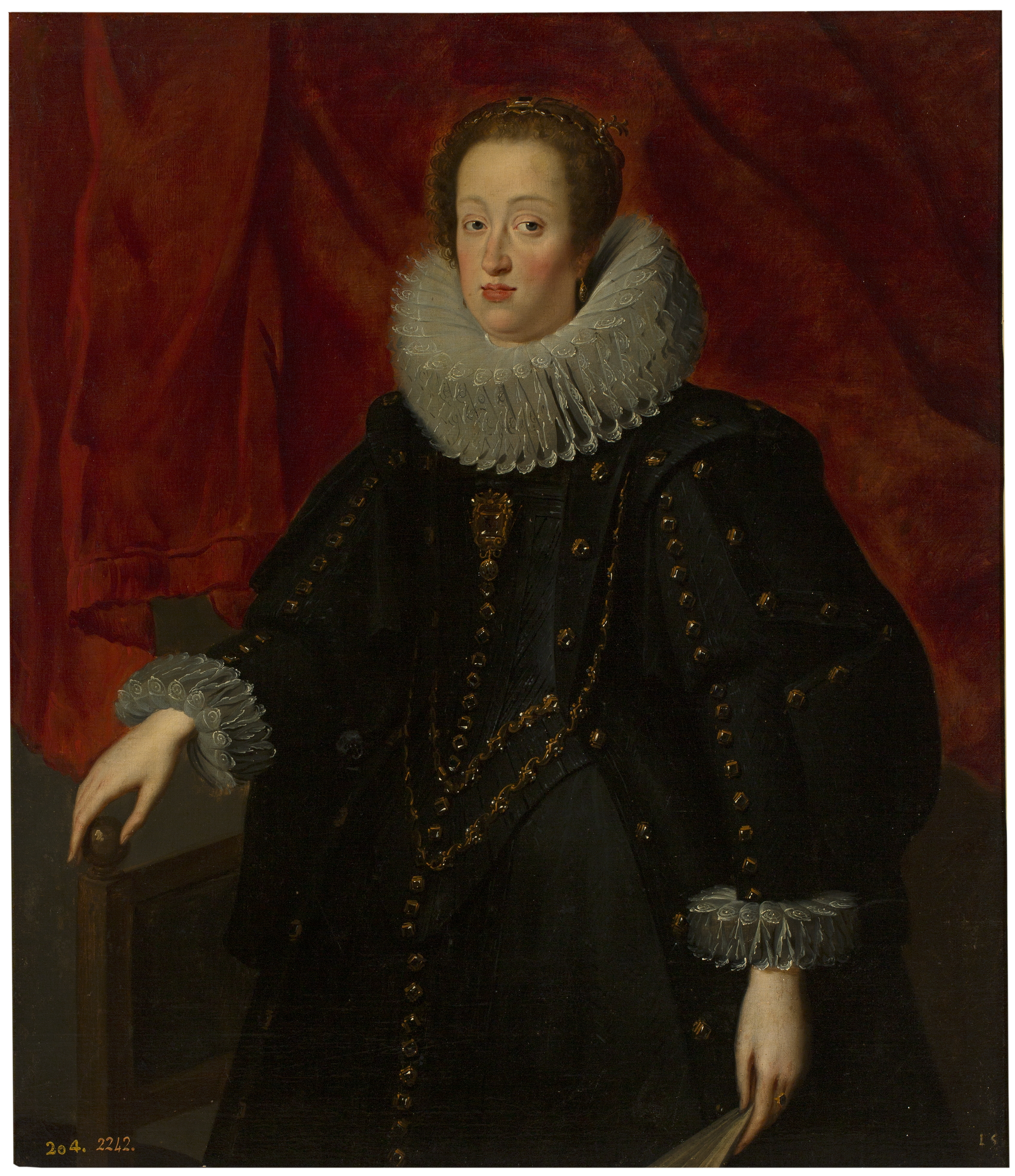
Eleonora as Holy Roman Empress, by Justus Sustermans

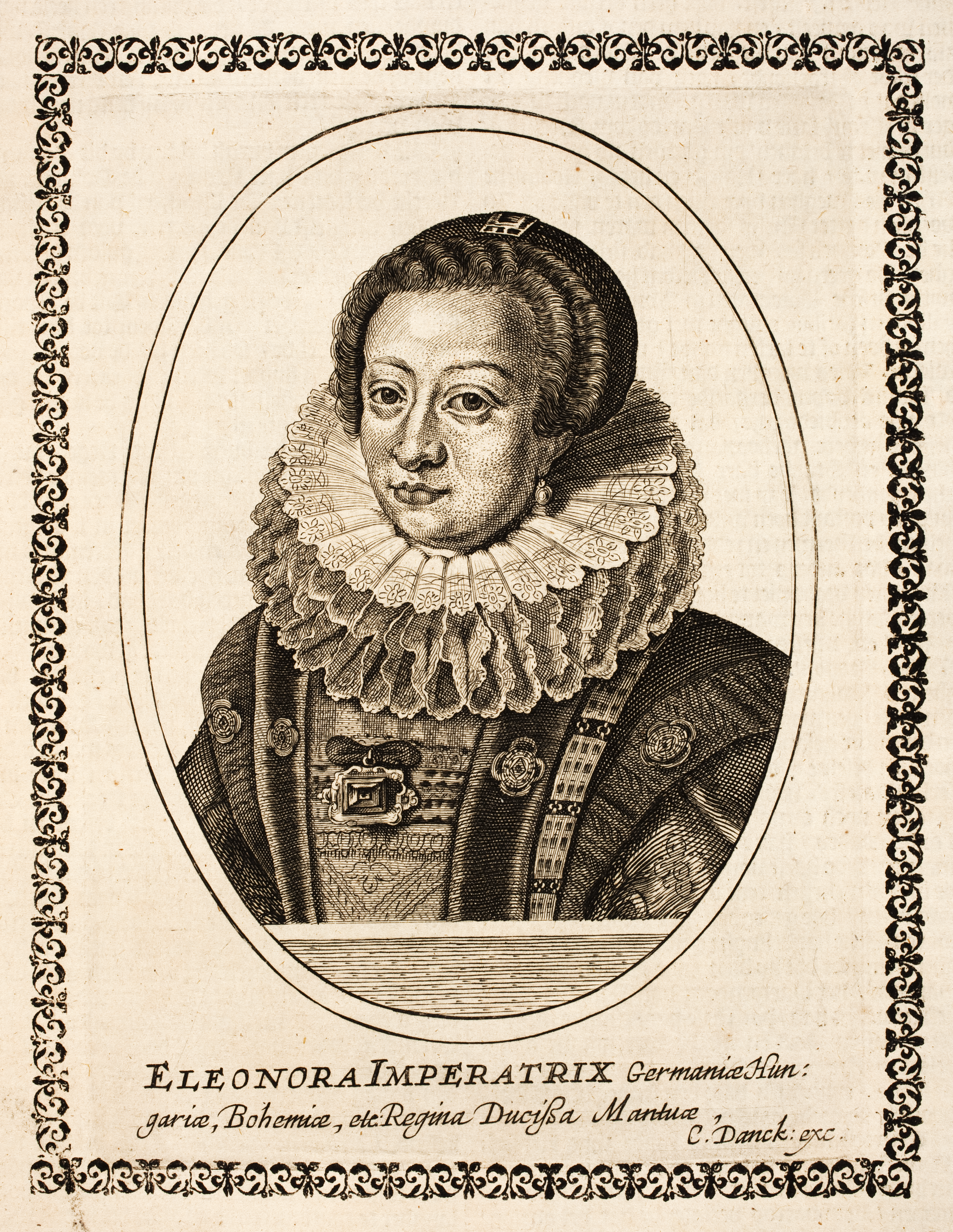
Engraving of Eleonora as Holy Roman Empress, by Cornelis Danckaerts, 1642.

Immediately upon her arrival in Vienna, Eleonora learned the German language. She hired servants of the previous empress, sending most of her native servants back to Mantua. Ferdinand II gave his wife the Favorita palace, which had previously belonged to his late wife. Later, she also received possession of the Laxenburg and Schönbrunn palaces.

In Pressburg on 26 July 1622 Eleonora was crowned Queen of Hungary, on 7 November 1627 in Regensburg Cathedral was crowned Holy Roman Empress and German Queen, and on 21 November of that year in Prague was crowned Queen of Bohemia.

Eleonora was not greatly interested in politics, but she tried to be a good empress for her subjects. She often accompanied her husband to meetings with the imperial electors, and the heads of states of the Empire. Among the many contributions made by her, was the construction of the chapel of the Madonna of Loreto in the Augustinian Church. Consecrated on 9 September 1627, the chapel became the second one used by the Imperial court. Behind the chapel was built, the Herzgruft , which later contained the hearts of members of the House of Habsburg. With the blessing of Pope Urban VIII, the Empress built a monastery of Discalced Carmelites in Vienna, and in her will bequeathed 80,000 florins for prayers to be said for the salvation of her soul after her death. Together with her husband, she founded another monastery in Vienna, that of the Discalced Carmelites and she was a benefactress of the brotherhood which arranged for the burial of the homeless people. The Empress also supported the Discalced Carmelite in Graz.

Despite her attention to her German subjects, Eleonora did not deny her support to her Italian compatriots who came to her court. The Empress gave her patronage to Italian musicians and dancers. Thanks to her, the Imperial court in Vienna became a center of European baroque music. She began the tradition of attending the opera and ballet performances during special celebrations in the Imperial family; the first one took place during Ferdinand II's birthday in 1625, and to this end, the Hofburg large wooden hall was built.

A source of deep concern for Eleonora was the War of the Mantuan Succession (1628–1631), which began after the deaths of her brothers Francesco IV (1612), Ferdinando (1626) and Vincenzo II (1627) without surviving legitimate male heirs. During the war between the Emperor, King Philip IV of Spain and Charles Emmanuel I, Duke of Savoy on one side (who supported Ferrante II Gonzaga, Duke of Guastalla) and King Louis XIII of France and the Republic of Venice (who supported Charles Gonzaga, Duke of Nevers) on the other side, the Imperial army captured and sacked Mantua, the Empress' homeland.

=== Widowhood and later years ===
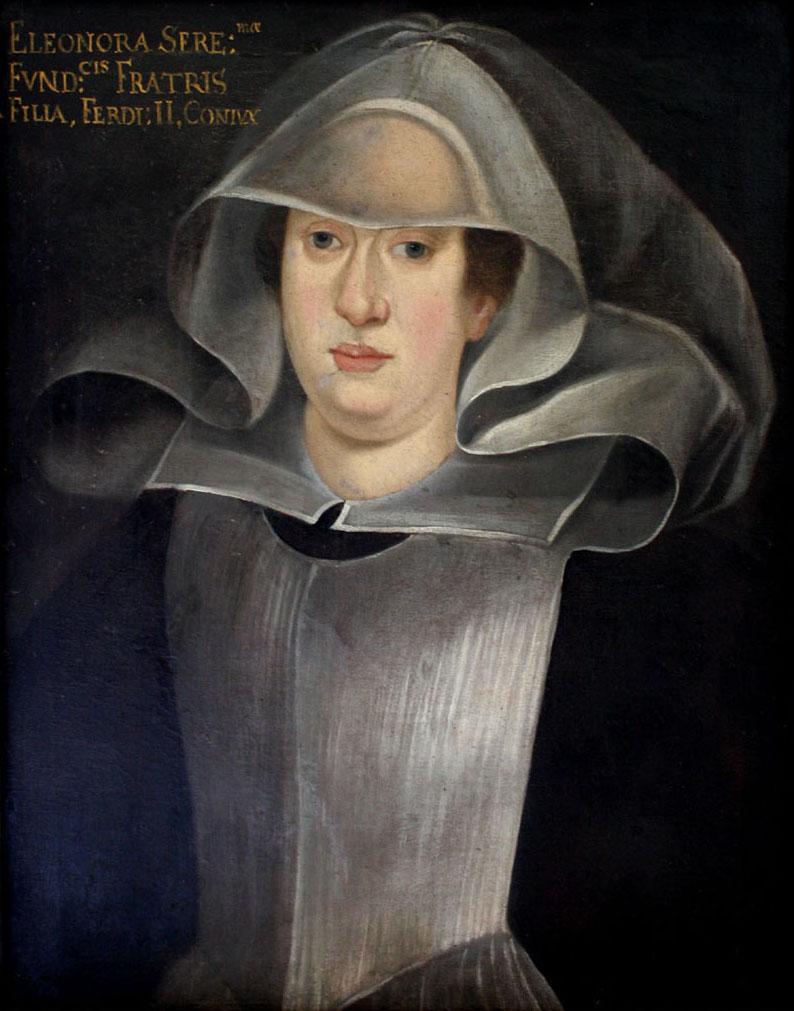
Eleonora as Dowager Holy Roman Empress

Emperor Ferdinand II died on 15 February 1637. Widowed, Eleonora settled in Graz Castle, near her husband's mausoleum. In the same year she moved to Vienna and settled in the Discalced Carmelites Monastery which she had earlier founded. According to contemporaries, the Dowager Empress led a pious life. She spent part of her time in her palaces outside the city, for example, in Schönbrunn, which was landscaped by her much in the spirit of the Italian baroque.

On 18 April 1637 the monetary amount which belonged to her as Dowager Empress was settled on her, although this amount was changed repeatedly. The jewellery that she received from her husband during their marriage, including the one of diamond with pearls, given to her on their wedding day, was returned to the treasury of the House of Habsburg.

As before, the empress dowager led an active correspondence with her Italian and Austrian relatives. She was authorized by Charles II, Duke of Mantua and Montferrat to be his proxy in the negotiations of the marriage contract between his sister Eleonora and her stepson Emperor Ferdinand III, which was finally signed on 8 February 1651.

In her will, which was drawn up in 1651 and last amended shortly before her death, the Dowager Empress appointed her grandniece and namesake Empress Eleonora as her main heiress. In addition, she left considerable amounts for memorial services and charity. Eleonora, Dowager Empress and German Queen, died in Vienna on 27 June 1655 aged 56 and was buried in the monastery of the Discalced Carmelites. The Empress's heart was placed in a vessel, which is placed next to the tomb of her husband in his mausoleum. In 1782, her remains were transferred to St. Stephen's Cathedral in Vienna.

== Ancestry ==
Ancestors of Eleonora Gonzaga (born 1598)

8. Federico II Gonzaga, Duke of Mantua
4. Guglielmo Gonzaga, Duke of Mantua
9. Margaret Paleologa
2. Vincenzo I Gonzaga, Duke of Mantua
10. Ferdinand I, Holy Roman Emperor (=14)
5. Eleanor of Austria
11. Anne of Bohemia and Hungary (=15)
1. Eleonora Gonzaga
12. Cosimo I de' Medici, Grand Duke of Tuscany
6. Francesco I de' Medici, Grand Duke of Tuscany
13. Eleanor of Toledo
3. Eleanor de' Medici
14. Ferdinand I, Holy Roman Emperor (=10)
7. Joanna of Austria
15. Anne of Bohemia and Hungary (=11)

== Bibliography ==
- Brigitte Hamann: Die Habsburger. 1988, p. 78f.
- Braun, Bettina; Keller, Katrin; Schnettger, Matthias (4 April 2016). Nur die Frau des Kaisers?: Kaiserinnen in der Frühen Neuzeit (in German). Böhlau Verlag Wien. p. 117. ISBN 978-3-205-20085-7.
- Raviola, Blythe Alice (2014). Corti e diplomazia nell'Europa del Seicento: Correggio e Ottavio Bolognesi (in Italian). Universitas Studiorum. p. 24, 43–44, 49, 171. ISBN 978-8-89-768364-3.
- Semenov, S. (2002). Christian European dynasty (in Russian). OLMA Media Group. p. 198. ISBN 978-5-22-402516-9.

=== Royal titles ===
Eleonora Gonzaga (born 1598) House of Gonzaga Born: 23 September 1598 Died: 27 June 1655
Royal titles
Preceded by Maria Anna of Bavaria	Archduchess consort of Inner Austria; 1622–1637	Succeeded by Maria Anna of Spain
Preceded by Anna of Tyrol	Empress of the Holy Roman Empire; 1622–1637	Succeeded by Maria Anna of Spain
Preceded by Anna of Tyrol	German Queen; 1622–1637	Succeeded by Maria Anna of Spain
Preceded by Anna of Tyrol	Queen consort of Hungary; 1622–1637	Succeeded by Maria Anna of Spain
Preceded by Elizabeth of England	Queen consort of Bohemia; 1622–1637	Succeeded by Maria Anna of Spain
