= Camilla Faà =

Italian noblewoman

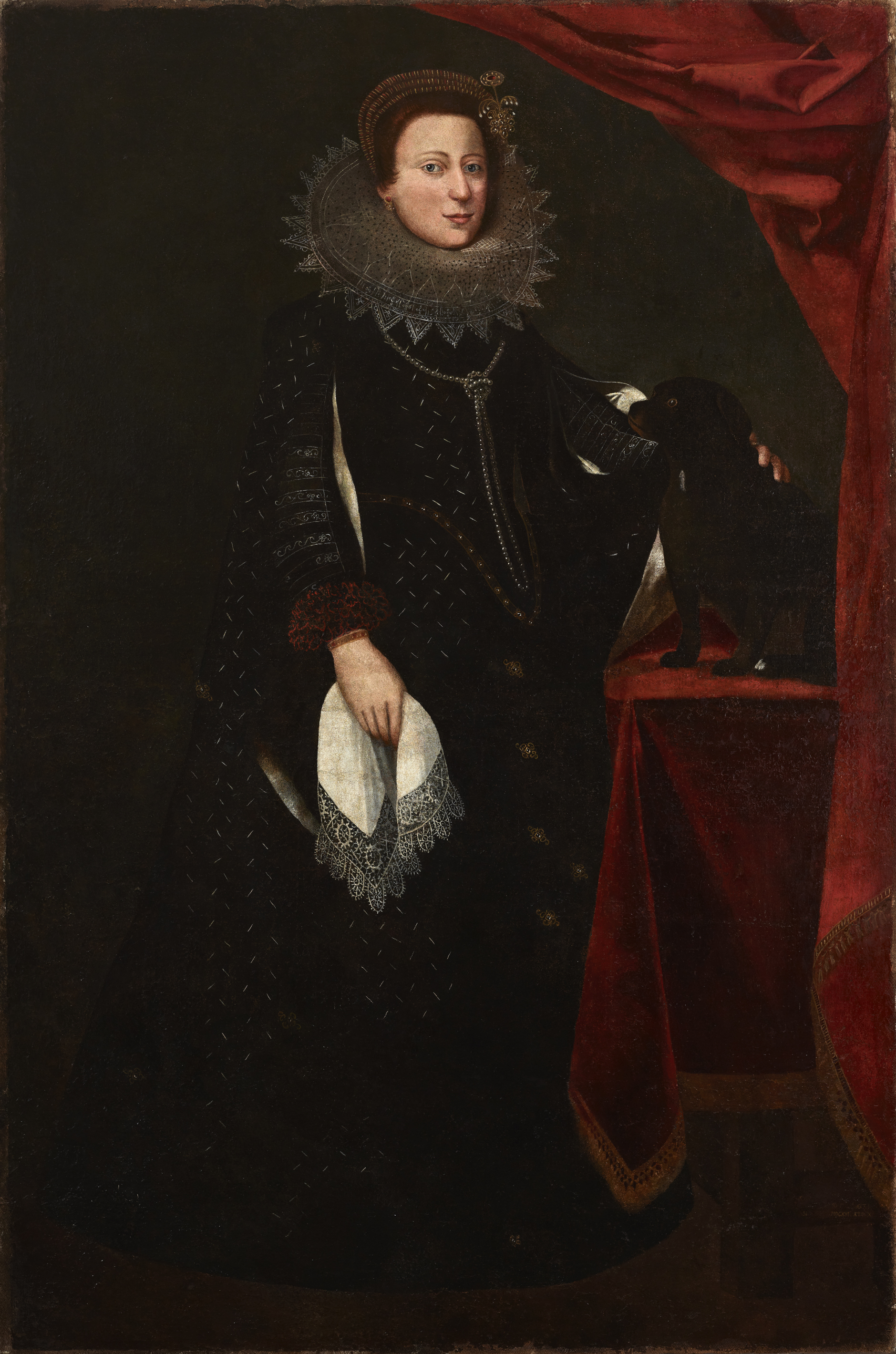
Portrait of Camilla Faà di Bruno

Camilla Faà di Bruno, also da Casale, also Camilla Faà Gonzaga (c. 1599 – 14 July 1662) was an Italian noble who was married secretly, briefly and morganatically to Ferdinando the Gonzaga Duke of Mantua and Duke of Montferrat. Repudiated by her husband she became a nun and the sixteen page memoir which she wrote in 1622 at the behest of her Mother Superior has been described as the first prose autobiography written by an Italian woman. Her story was the subject of Paolo Giacometti’s historical drama Camilla Faa da Casale, first performed at the Teatro Nuovo, Florence on 29 October 1846.

== Life ==
She was born to Ardizzino Faà, Count of Bruno (d. 1616), a military man and diplomat, by his wife, Margherita Fassati. The young Camilla became one of the many companions of the duchess Margherita di Savoia at the Gonzaga court of Casale: capital of the Duchy of Montferrat of which Margherita’s husband Francesco Gonzaga was governor. In February 1612 Francesco’s father Vincenzo died. Francesco succeeded him as Duke of Mantua and of Montferrat and the court transferred from Casale to Mantua where, on 22 December of the same year, Francesco himself died during an outbreak of smallpox.

His successor as Duke was Ferdinando, until then a cardinal at Rome with a reputation as a womaniser. The 16-year-old Camilla, now a great beauty and known to all as La bella Ardizzina, became the object of his attention: attentions which she resisted, however, to the point that he was first obliged to promise marriage in writing and then actually to marry her. The nuptials took place in secret on 19 February 1616 in the chapel of the Palazzo Ducale and Camilla became pregnant shortly afterwards.

Attempts to keep the marriage secret failed and both the court and Ferdinando’s relations took the news very badly, whether out of envy or because they thought that the duke had married beneath himself and had failed to protect the dynasty. It appears that initially, Ferdinand wanted to maintain the marriage: in August he granted her the marquisate of Mombaruzzo and the income from various territories in Montferrat and in the area of Acqui. However, the hostility that she faced from the Mantuan nobility became too much for Camilla and, at her own request, she left the city for Bruno. At this time Montferrat was at war with Savoy, who wanted to wrest it from the Gonzagas. Either out of fear that she would flee to the enemy or for her own protection from them, she was moved from Bruno to the Castle of the Paleologi at Casale, one of the most heavily fortified cities in Italy. Ferdinando joined her there in November and on 5 December she gave birth to their son, Giacinto Teodoro Giovanni. Ferdinando recognised the boy as his son while failing to recognise him as his heir; the duke remained in Casale until the New Year.

In the meantime, he had been persuaded that he should repudiate la bella Ardizzina and make a more dynastically suitable marriage. He achieved both with some alacrity. A pronouncement that the marriage had been invalid was obtained from Pope Paul V, and on 7 February 1617 he married Caterina de’ Medici.

Camilla was recalled to Mantua where, to avoid the humiliation of returning as a mere courtier, she took lodgings in a monastery. Giacinto, however, was brought up at the Mantuan court and achieved some popularity. In November 1618 the duke compelled her to enter an enclosed order of nuns in the convent of Corpus Domini at Ferrara. She entered as a secular but in 1622 took her vows and spent the rest of her life there as a nun.

Camilla Faà di Bruno died on 14 July 1662 at the age of 63 in the convent of Corpus Domini where she was buried next to an earlier beauty of Ferrara, Lucrezia Borgia. She had far outlived Duke Ferdinando, who died in 1626; Caterina de' Medici, who died, childless, in 1629; and Giacinto, who died of the plague (or perhaps was murdered) in 1630.
