= Vincenzo I Gonzaga =

Duke of Mantua and Montferrat from 1587 to 1612

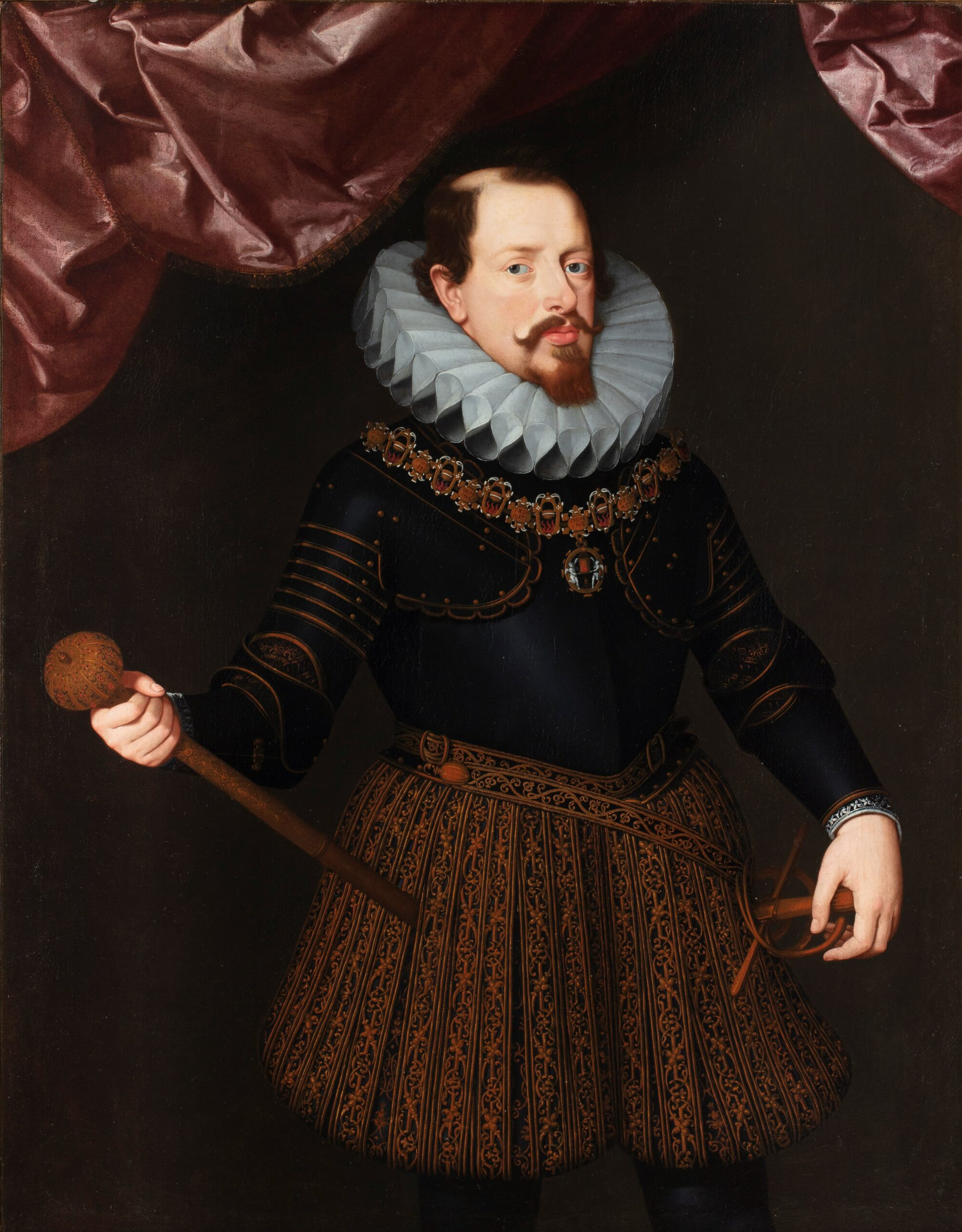
- Portrait of Duke of Mantua Vincenzo I Gonzaga wearing the collar of the Order of the Redeemer

Duke of Mantua and Montferrat
- Reign: 14 August 1587 – 9 February 1612
- Coronation: 22 September 1587
- Predecessor: Guglielmo Gonzaga
- Successor: Francesco IV Gonzaga
- Born: 21 September 1562
- Died: 9 February 1612 (aged 49)
- Burial: 9 February 1612; Basilica of Sant'Andrea
- Spouse: Margherita Farnese; Eleonora de' Medici
- Issue Detail: Francesco IV, Duke of Mantua; Ferdinando I, Duke of Mantua; Guglielmo Domenico; Margherita, Duchess of Lorraine; Vincenzo II, Duke of Mantua; Eleonora, Holy Roman Empress
Names
- Vincenzo Gonzaga
- House: Gonzaga
- Father: Guglielmo Gonzaga
- Mother: Eleanor of Austria
- Religion: Roman Catholicism
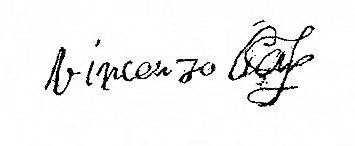
- Signature

Vincenzo Ι Gonzaga (21 September 1562 – 9 February 1612 (Note: Paul F. Grendler states Vincenzo died on 18 February 1612.)) was the ruler of the Duchy of Mantua and the Duchy of Montferrat from 1587 to 1612.

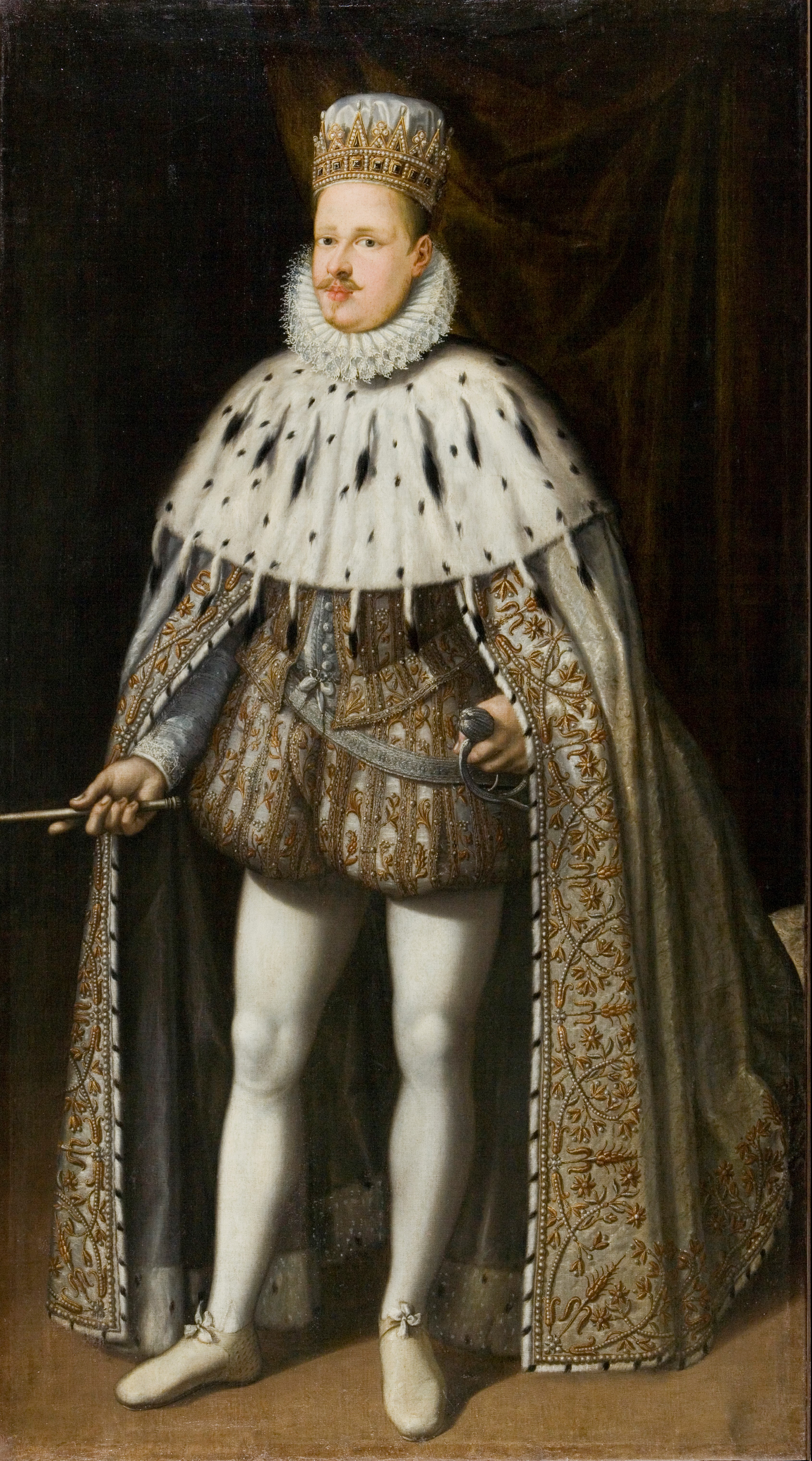
Vincenzo I Gonzaga on the day of his coronation

== Biography ==
Born 21 September 1562, Vincenzo was the only son of Guglielmo Gonzaga, Duke of Mantua, and Archduchess Eleanor of Austria. His maternal grandparents were Ferdinand I, Holy Roman Emperor, and Anna of Bohemia and Hungary.

In 1582, Vincenzo murdered in cold blood the brilliant young Scottish polymath James Crichton, an employee of his father's court, of whom Vincenzo had become crazed with jealousy.

Vincenzo was a major patron of the arts and sciences, and turned Mantua into a vibrant cultural centre. On 22 September 1587, Vincent was crowned the fourth Duke of Mantua, with a glitzy ceremony in which were present the highest authority of the duchy to pay homage to the new Duke of Mantua: he then moved with a ride through the city streets. Vincenzo employed the composer Claudio Monteverdi and the painter Peter Paul Rubens. In 1590 Monteverdi became a viol-player and cantor in the music chapel of Vincenzo; in 1602 Vincenzo appointed him master of music on the death of Benedetto Pallavicino. Vincenzo was also a friend of the poet Torquato Tasso. A small book published in Verona in 1589 describes how a comic actor named Valerini in the service of Vincenzo imagines an ideal gallery of art, in which statues of the most important art collectors are featured rather than the work of the artists themselves. Vincenzo was described as a colossus who would dominate the entire ideal gallery, called the Celestial Gallery of Minerva.

The astronomer Giovanni Antonio Magini also served as tutor to Vincenzo's sons, Francesco and Ferdinando.

Magini's life's work was the preparation of the Atlante geografico d'Italia (Geographic Atlas of Italy), printed posthumously by Magini's son in 1620. This was intended to include maps of each Italian region with exact nomenclature and historical notes. A major project, its production (begun in 1594) proved. Vincenzo, to whom the atlas is dedicated, assisted him with this project and allowed for maps of the various states of Italy to be brought to Magini.

During the winter of 1603–1604, Galileo visited the Mantuan court in an effort to obtain a position there, and was offered a salary, but could not agree on the terms with Vincenzo, who instead presented Galileo with a gold chain and two silver dishes.

Vincenzo's spendthrift habits are considered to have accelerated Mantua's economic and cultural decline.

At the age of 46, Vincenzo was rumoured to have become impotent and he is said to have sent a secret expedition to the New World in order to obtain a legendary aphrodisiac.

On 20 July 1588, Emperor Rudolf II granted Vincenzo the right to an escutcheon of Austria, surmounted by an archducal coronet. Vincenzo created the Order of the Redemptor (or of the Most Precious Blood), approved by Pope Paul V, on 25 May 1608.

In 1608, to appease the continuous demands of the Duke of Savoy, Vincenzo agreed to a political marriage between his first son and heir, Francesco Gonzaga, and the Duke of Savoy's daughter, Margaret of Savoy. For Vincenzo, this marriage had the political objective of warming the "cold" relations that existed between the two courts of Mantua and Turin.

== Issue ==
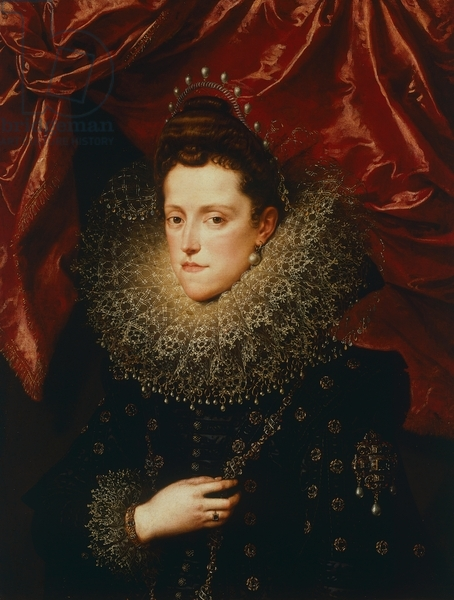
Eleonora de' Medici.

Vincenzo married Margherita Farnese in 1581; their marriage was childless and they divorced. On 29 April 1584 he married his first cousin Eleonora de' Medici, the daughter of Francesco I de' Medici and Joanna of Austria.

Vincenzo and Eleonora had:

- Francesco (7 May 1586 – 22 December 1612), who ruled as Duke of Mantua and Duke of Montferrat between 9 February and 22 December 1612.
- Ferdinando (26 April 1587 – 29 October 1626), who ruled as Duke of Mantua and Duke of Montferrat from 1612 until his death.
- Guglielmo Domenico (4 April 1589 – 12 May 1591), nicknamed "(Lungaspada)", Marquis of Monferrato. Died in infancy.
- Margherita (2 October 1591 – 7 February 1632), wife of Henry II, Duke of Lorraine
- Vincenzo (7 January 1594 – 25 December 1627), ruled as Duke of Mantua and Marquess of Montferrat from 1626 until his death.
- Eleonora (23 September 1598 – 27 June 1655), second wife of Ferdinand II, Holy Roman Emperor.

He had several illegitimate children, including:

By Agnese Argotta, wife of Prospero del Carretto:

- Francesco Gonzaga (1588-1673), bishop of Nola in 1657 (Note: Finucci states that Francesco's mother is unknown.)
- Silvio (1592-1612), Knight of Malta, the court poet Mantovana, and Marquis Cavriana.
- Giovanni (? -1679), Minister of Ferdinando Carlo Gonzaga to Turin, where he had the 'task to prevent the riding of Ercole Mattioli for the sale of Monferrato to the France of Louis XIV.
- Eleanora, nun.

By Felicita Guerrieri, daughter of Tullo Guerrieri:

- Francesca.

== Honours ==
- Grand Master of the Order of the Redeemer
- Knight of the Order of the Golden Fleece

== Sources ==
- Bellonci, Maria (1956). A Prince of Mantua: The Life and Times of Vincenzo Gonzaga. London: Weidenfeld and Nicolson.
- Bourne, Molly (2016). "Vicenzo Gonzaga and the Body Politic: Impotence and Virility at Court". In Matthews-Grieco, Sara F. (ed.). Cuckoldry, Impotence and Adultery in Europe (15th-17th century). Routledge. pp. 35–58.
- Bowers, Roger (2007). "Monteverdi at Mantua, 1590-1612". In Whenham, John; Wistreich, Richard (eds.). The Cambridge Companion to Monteverdi. Cambridge University Press.
- Brinton, Selwyn (1927). The Gonzaga. Lords of Mantua. London: Methuen.
- Fenlon, Iain (1980). Music and Patronage in Sixteenth-Century Mantua. Cambridge: Cambridge University Press.
- Finucci, Valeria (2015). The Prince's Body: Vincenzo Gonzaga and Renaissance Medicine. Harvard University Press.
- Grendler, Paul F. (2009). The University of Mantua, the Gonzaga, and the Jesuits, 1584–1630. The Johns Hopkins University Press.
- Harrán, Don (1999). Salamone Rossi: Jewish Musician in Late Renaissance Mantua. Oxford University Press.
- Johnston, Gregory S. (2013). A Heinrich Schütz Reader: Letters and Documents in Translation. Oxford University Press.
- Kaleva, Daniela (2021). ""Lamento d'Arianna": a transhistorical study of staged emotions and affective audience responses". In Davidson, Jane W.; Halliwell, Michael; Rocke, Stephanie (eds.). Opera, Emotion, and the Antipodes, Applied Perspectives: Compositions and Performances. Vol. II. Routledge. pp. 137–166. ISBN 978-0-367-47697-7.
- Parrott, David (1997). "The Mantuan Succession, 1627–31: A Sovereignty Dispute in Early Modern Europe". The English Historical Review. CXII (445, February). Oxford Academic: 20–65. doi:10.1093/ehr/CXII.445.20.
- Vermeylen, Filip (2004). "Antwerp Beckons". Netherlands Yearbook for History of Art / Nederlands Kunsthistorisch Jaarboek Online. 55 (1): 16–33. doi:10.1163/22145966-90000103.

Vincenzo I Gonzaga House of Gonzaga Born: 21 September 1562 Died: 9 February 1612
Regnal titles
Preceded by Guglielmo	Duke of Mantua; 1587–1612	Succeeded by Francesco IV
Preceded by Guglielmo	Duke of Montferrat; 1587–1612	Succeeded by Francesco IV
