= Treaty of Cherasco =

The Treaty of Cherasco was a treaty signed on 6 April 1631 which ended the War of the Mantuan Succession. A second treaty was signed on 19 June 1631, confirming the first and also stipulating new provisions concerning the conduct of the troop withdrawal.

== The treaty ==
The treaty was signed at the Palazzo Salmatoris in the Piedmontese city of Cherasco between plenipotentiaries of the Kingdom of France, the Holy Roman Empire and the Duchy of Savoy. Representatives of Spain and the Pope were also present. The main negotiators were Abel Servien for France, Matthias Gallas for the Holy Roman Empire and Jules Mazarin, the future Cardinal Mazarin, for the Pope.

The treaty stipulated that :

- the French noble Charles I of Nevers would become the next Duke of Mantua and Montferrat.
- The Montferrat towns of Trino and Alba were ceded to the Duke of Savoy. In return, he renounced his claims to Montferrat.
- Ferrante II Gonzaga renounced his claims to the Duchy of Mantua and received Reggiolo and Luzzara as compensation
- The strategic Piedmontese location of Pinerolo was awarded to France.
- All foreign troops are to be withdrawn.
