= Ferdinando Gonzaga, Duke of Mantua =

Ferdinando Gonzaga
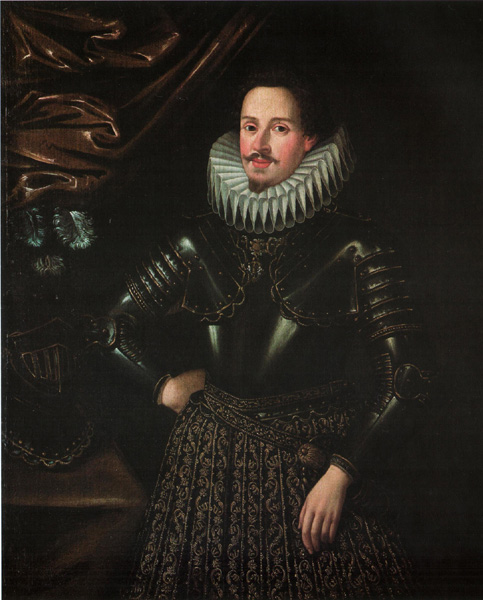
- Ferdinando Gonzaga

Duke of Mantua and Montferrat
- Reign: 22 December 1612 - 29 October 1626
- Predecessor: Francesco IV Gonzaga
- Successor: Vincenzo II Gonzaga
- Born: 26 April 1587; Mantua, Duchy of Mantua
- Died: 29 October 1626 (aged 39); Mantua, Duchy of Mantua
- Burial: Basilica palatina di Santa Barbara
- Spouse: Camilla Faa (morganatic); Catherine de' Medici
- Issue: Francesco Giacinto Teodoro Giovanni
- House: House of Gonzaga
- Father: Vincenzo I Gonzaga
- Mother: Eleonora de' Medici

Ferdinand I Gonzaga (26 April 1587 – 29 October 1626) was Duke of Mantua and Duke of Montferrat from 1612 until his death.

== Biography ==
Ferdinando Gonzaga when he still was a Cardinal (1607-1615)

Born in Mantua, he was the son of Vincenzo I and Eleonora de' Medici.

On 10 December 1607, he was appointed a cardinal by Pope Paul V at the age of 20. A few years after his elder brother, Duke Francesco IV, died in 1612 without male heirs, he renounced the ecclesiastical career on 16 November 1615, and succeeded his brother in both the Duchy of Mantua and the Duchy of Montferrat.

In 1616, he secretly married Camilla Faà di Bruno, whom he divorced in the same year. Their son Francesco Giacinto Teodoro Giovanni Gonzaga, although accepted at court, was not made Ferdinando's heir. He died of the plague at the age of 14, during the 1630 siege of Mantua.

On 16 February 1617, Ferdinando married Caterina de' Medici (1593–1629), the daughter of Ferdinand I, Grand Duke of Tuscany. They had no children.

Ferdinand Gonzaga died in 1626. His younger brother Vincenzo II inherited the duchy.

== Family ==
In 1616 he married Camilla Faà di Bruno, they had:

- Francesco Giacinto Gonzaga (4 December 1616 – 1630), Lord of Bianzè since 1624, benefited Priest of St. Benedict Polirone.

== Honours ==
- Grand Master of the Order of the Redeemer
- Knight of Order of Malta

== Sources ==
- Grendler, Paul F. (2009). The University of Mantua, the Gonzaga, and the Jesuits, 1584–1630. Johns Hopkins University Press.
- Parrott, David (1997). "The Mantuan Succession, 1627–31: A Sovereignty Dispute in Early Modern Europe". The English Historical Review. CXII, Issue 445, February (445). Oxford Academic: 20–65. doi:10.1093/ehr/CXII.445.20.

== Ancestry ==
Ancestors of Ferdinando Gonzaga, Duke of Mantua

16. Francesco II Gonzaga, Marquess of Mantua
8. Federico II, Duke of Mantua
17. Isabella d'Este
4. Guglielmo X Gonzaga, Duke of Mantua
18. William IX, Marquess of Montferrat
9. Margaret Palaeologina
19. Anne of Alençon
2. Vincenzo Gonzaga, Duke of Mantua
20. Philip I of Castile
10. Ferdinand I, Holy Roman Emperor
21. Joanna of Castile
5. Archduchess Eleanor of Austria
22. Vladislas II of Hungary
11. Anna of Bohemia and Hungary
23. Anna of Foix-Candale
1. Ferdinando Gonzaga, Duke of Mantua
24. Giovanni dalle Bande Nere
12. Cosimo I de' Medici, Grand Duke of Tuscany
25. Maria Salviati
6. Francesco I de' Medici, Grand Duke of Tuscany
26. Pedro Álvarez de Toledo, 2nd Marquis of Villafranca
13. Eleanor of Toledo
27. Maria Osorio
3. Eleonora de' Medici
28. Philip I of Castile (= 20)
14. Ferdinand I, Holy Roman Emperor (= 10)
29. Joanna of Castile (= 21)
7. Archduchess Joanna of Austria
30. Vladislas II of Hungary (= 22)
15. Anna of Bohemia and Hungary (= 11)
31. Anna of Foix-Candale (= 23)

Regnal titles
Preceded by Francis IV	Duke of Mantua; 1612–1626	Succeeded by Vincent II
Preceded by Francis IV	Duke of Montferrat; 1612–1626	Succeeded by Vincent II
