= Duchy of Montferrat =

Historic Italian state located in Piedmont

Duchy of Montferrat Ducato del Monferrato (Italian)
- 1574–1708
- Flag Gonzaga (Argent a chief gules)
- Status: Duchy
- Capital: Casale Monferrato; 45°08′N 8°27′E
- Common languages: Italian; Piedmontese
- Religion: Catholicism
- Duke
  - 1574–1587: Guglielmo Gonzaga (first duke)
  - 1665–1708: Ferdinando Carlo Gonzaga (last)
- Historical era: Modern Era
  - March of Montferrat raised to a duchy: 1574
  - War of the Mantuan Succession: 1628–31
  - Claims by House of Savoy confirmed: 1648
  - Annexed by Duchy of Savoy: 1708
  - Treaty of Utrecht: 1713
- Currency: Cavallotto, Ducat
Preceded by	Succeeded by
March of Montferrat	Duchy of Savoy

The Duchy of Montferrat was a state located in Northern Italy. It was created out of what was left of the medieval March of Montferrat after the last Palaeologus heir had died (1533) and the margraviate had been briefly controlled by the Emperor Charles V (until 1536). After that brief interlude, it passed by marriage of the last heiress, Margaret of Montferrat, to the House of Gonzaga, already dukes of Mantua. In 1574 the fief was elevated from marquisate to duchy.

Its territory, located in southern Piedmont, is still known today as Montferrat.

At that time, the state of Montferrat had an area of 2750 km^{2}, and consisted of two separate parts bordered by the Duchy of Savoy, the Duchy of Milan, and the Republic of Genoa. Its capital was Casale Monferrato.

With the War of the Mantuan Succession (1628–1631), a piece of the duchy passed to Savoy; the remainder passed to Savoy in 1708, as Leopold I, Holy Roman Emperor, gained possession of the principal Gonzaga territory, the Duchy of Mantua.

== See also ==
- Rulers of Montferrat, for a list of margraves and dukes
