= War of the Mantuan Succession =

1628–1631 war in Northern Italy

- Part of the Thirty Years' War
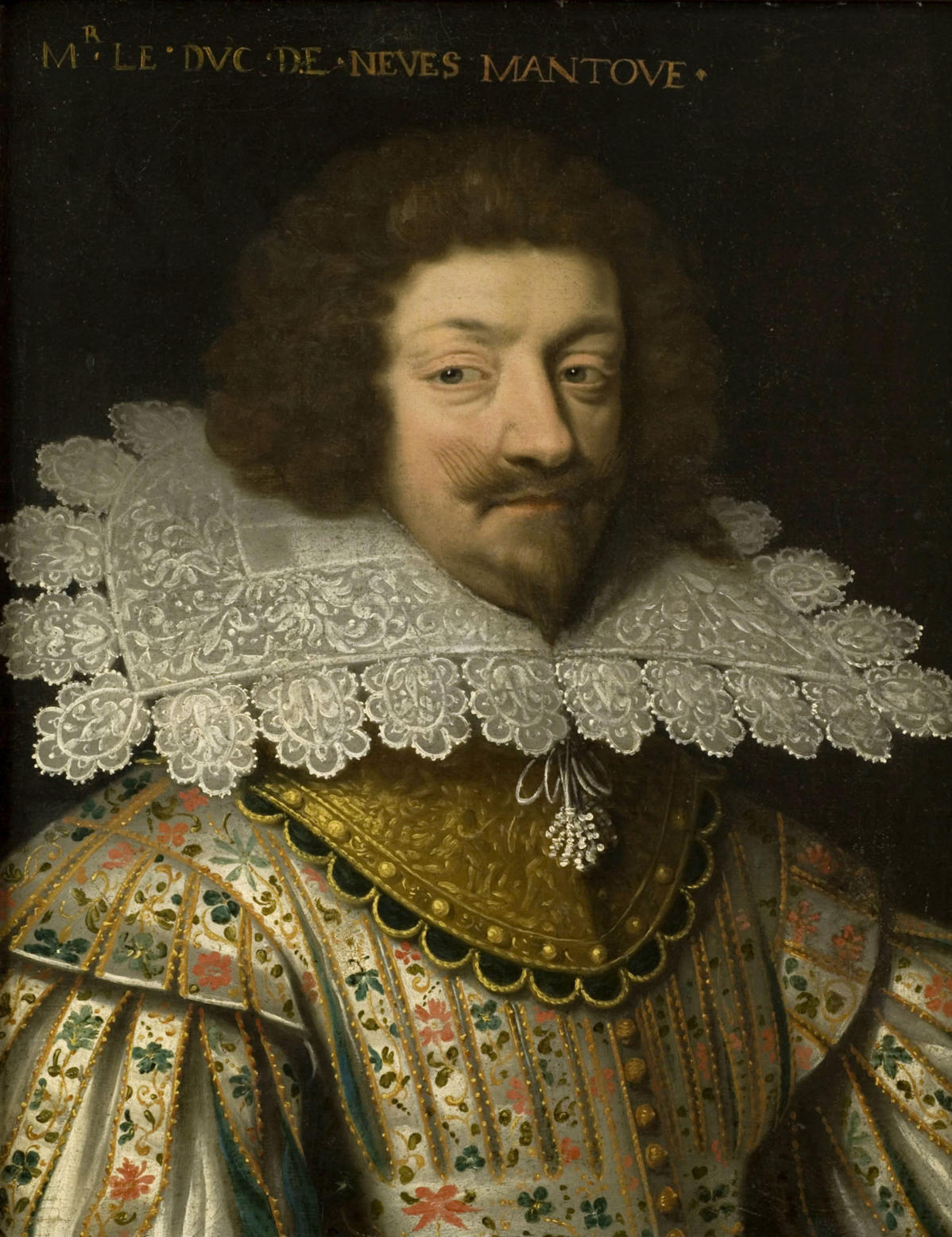
- Charles Gonzaga, Duke of Nevers
Date	1628–1631
Location	Northern Italy
Result	Treaty of Cherasco; Nevers confirmed as ruler of Mantua and Montferrat
Territorial changes	France occupies Pinerolo and Casale Monferrato; Savoy annexes Trino and Alba

Belligerents
Supporting the Duke of Nevers: (Kingdom of France) France; Venice; Mantua; Nevers	Supporting the Duke of Guastalla: Spain; Holy Roman Empire; (Duchy of Savoy) Savoy; Guastalla

Commanders and leaders
Duke of Nevers; (Kingdom of France) Louis XIII; (Kingdom of France) Cardinal Richelieu; (Kingdom of France) Montmorency; (Kingdom of France) Charles de Schomberg	Duke of Guastalla; (Spain) Ambrogio Spinola; (Spain) Gonzalo de Córdoba; (Holy Roman Empire) Romboldo Collalto #; (Holy Roman Empire) Mathias Gallas; (Holy Roman Empire) Johann von Aldringen; (Duchy of Savoy) Charles Emmanuel; (Duchy of Savoy) Victor Amadeus I

Strength
1628: c. 14,000; 1630: c. 53,400	1628: c. 37,000; 1630:c. 70,000

The War of the Mantuan Succession, 1628 to 1631, was caused by the death in December 1627 of Vincenzo II, last Gonzaga ruler of Mantua and Montferrat. This led to a proxy war between the French-backed Duke of Nevers and the Duke of Guastalla, supported by Spain. It is considered a related conflict of the 1618 to 1648 Thirty Years' War.

Fighting centred on the French-held fortress of Casale Monferrato, which the Spanish besieged twice. French intervention on behalf of Nevers in April 1629 led Emperor Ferdinand II to support Spain by transferring troops from Northern Germany. They captured Mantua in July 1630, but failed to take Casale. Ferdinand withdrew his troops in response to Swedish intervention in the Thirty Years' War, and both sides agreed a truce in October 1630.

The June 1631 Treaty of Cherasco, confirmed Nevers as Duke of Mantua and Montferrat, as well as leaving France in possession of Pinerolo and Casale, which controlled access to passes through the Alps. However, the diversion of Imperial resources from Germany helped the Swedes establish themselves within the Holy Roman Empire, where they would remain until the Treaty of Westphalia in 1648.

== Background ==
Mantua had been ruled since 1308 by the House of Gonzaga, who also acquired Montferrat in 1574 by marriage. Both territories were part of the Holy Roman Empire and of strategic importance to the area known as Lombardy, dominated by the Spanish-governed Duchy of Milan. This allowed Spain and Austria to threaten France's restive southern provinces of Languedoc and the Dauphiné, as well as protecting the overland supply route known as the Spanish Road.

Spanish possessions in Italy were a key source of military recruits and supplies throughout the 17th century. In recent decades, their position had been strengthened by the acquisition of Finale, and control of Piombino and Monaco, as well as fortresses in Modena and Mirandola. However, this expansion caused tensions with their regional rivals, Venice and Pope Urban VIII, ruler of the Papal States.

In February 1627, Vincenzo II tried to resolve the succession without involving outside powers. This proved impossible, because while both duchies were effectively independent states, their status as part of the Holy Roman Empire gave the Emperor some control over the succession. The strongest contender was Charles Gonzaga, Duke of Nevers, cousin of Vincenzo II and a French peer.

The potential threat to Spanish interests led Gonzalo de Córdoba to discuss alternative candidates with Madrid. These included Charles Emmanuel I, Duke of Savoy, and Ferrante II Gonzaga, who was also Imperial General Commissar in Italy. Nevers strengthened his position by having his son Charles marry Vincenzo's niece Maria Gonzaga, heiress of Montferrat on 23 December 1627. Vincenzo died three days later, and Nevers arrived in Mantua on 17 January, sending an envoy to Emperor Ferdinand II requesting Imperial recognition.

== Strategic objectives ==
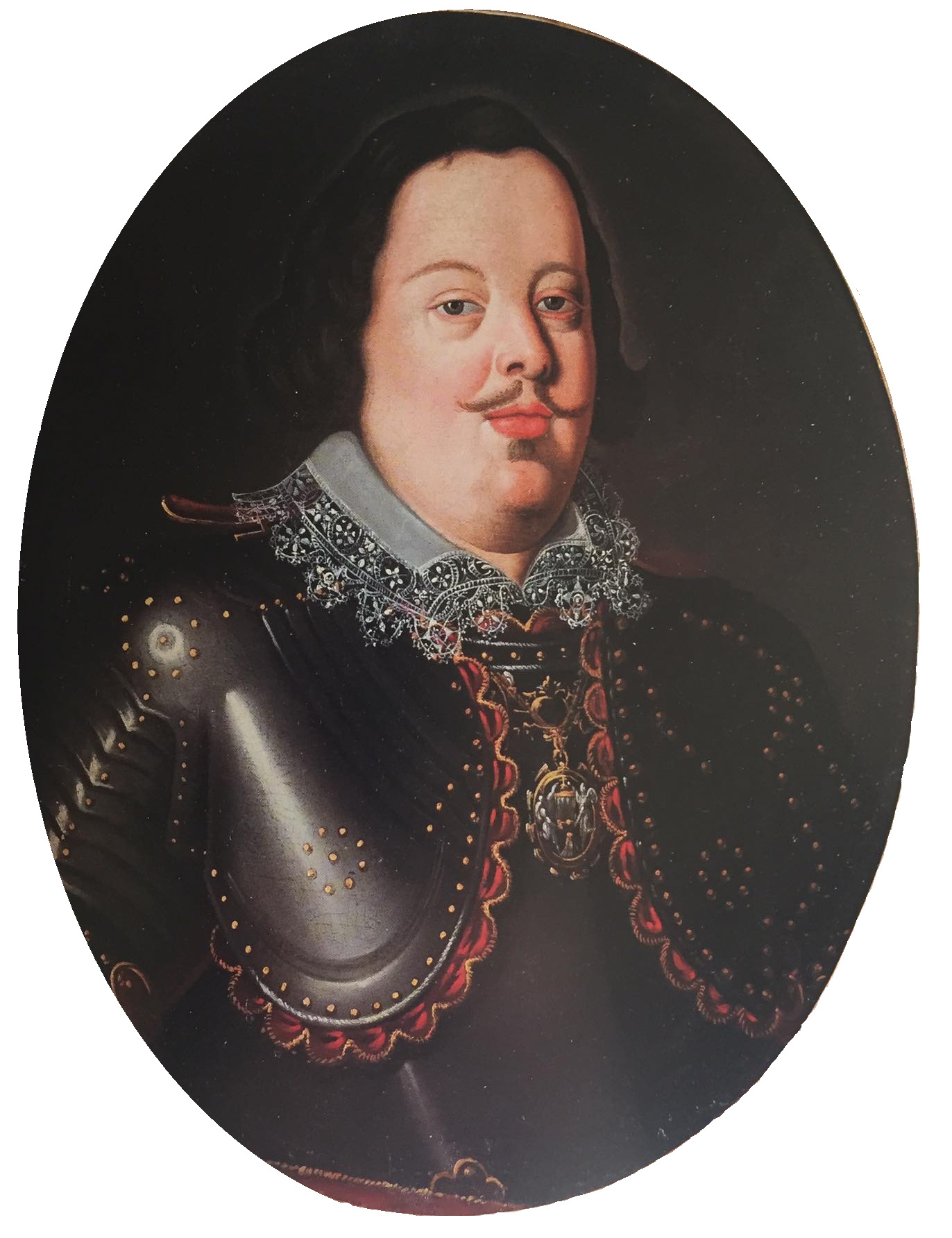
Vincenco II, whose death in December 1627 sparked the war

Historian Peter H. Wilson argues "none of the major powers ... was looking for a fight in Italy" and conflict was caused by a combination of events, including miscommunication between Córdoba and Madrid, as well as Nevers' refusal to compromise. Despite their family connections, the Spanish and Austrian Habsburgs did not necessarily share the same objectives. While Spain was always seeking to strengthen its position in northern Italy, Ferdinand wanted to avoid diverting resources from Germany, as well as to assert Imperial authority by deciding the succession question himself. He agreed to confirm Nevers as duke in return for the newly built fortress of Casale Monferrato, capital of Montferrat, a compromise suggested by his wife Empress Eleonora, sister of the recently deceased duke Vincenzo II.

This solution appeared acceptable, especially as French chief minister Cardinal Richelieu viewed Nevers as a Habsburg client and was fully occupied with the Siege of La Rochelle. However, it was undermined by the combined ambition of Córdoba and Charles Emmanuel, who from 1613 to 1617 had fought for possession of Montferrat. Shortly before Vincenzo's death, they agreed to partition the duchy, most of it going to Savoy while Spain took Casale, a deal approved by Philip IV of Spain and his chief minister Olivares. On 26 January, Ferdinand ordered Córdoba not to send troops into Mantua or Montferrat and on 1 April confiscated both territories pending a final decision on the succession. By then, it was too late to stop the fighting.

Since even large states like France struggled to fight simultaneously in multiple theatres, 17th century diplomacy focused on opening new fronts by building alliances against opponents, or freeing resources by ending an existing conflict. The same principle applied to the Habsburgs; lacking his own army, Ferdinand relied on support from his often reluctant German allies, or expensive mercenaries like Albrecht von Wallenstein. While the huge resources of the Spanish Empire meant they were better able to replace their losses, funding an offensive in Italy required suspending operations in Flanders. By forcing the Habsburgs onto the defensive in Germany, the conflict over the Mantuan succession had a disproportionate impact on the Thirty Years' War.

== Phase I: January 1628 to June 1629 ==
In giving their approval, both Olivares and Philip assumed Casale would be quickly taken but Córdoba took several months to mobilise 12,000 troops for operations in Montferrat, along with 8,000 supplied by Savoy. They joined 11,000 troops already assembled in the Duchy of Milan, while another 6,000 soldiers were used to screen the strategic town of Cremona and block the Alpine passes. Siege operations only began in March and since Casale was one of the largest and most modern fortifications in Europe, taking it would be a lengthy operation, giving Nevers time to recruit an army. Including militia and French mercenaries, he managed to raise a force of 14,000, including 2,000 cavalry, a significant number for a duchy with a population of only 300,000. In addition to support from Empress Eleonora, Venice and the Pope, Nevers was also backed by Ferdinand's military commander Wallenstein, who wanted his army to focus on capturing Stralsund in Northern Germany. These factors ultimately delayed any Imperial intervention until September 1629.

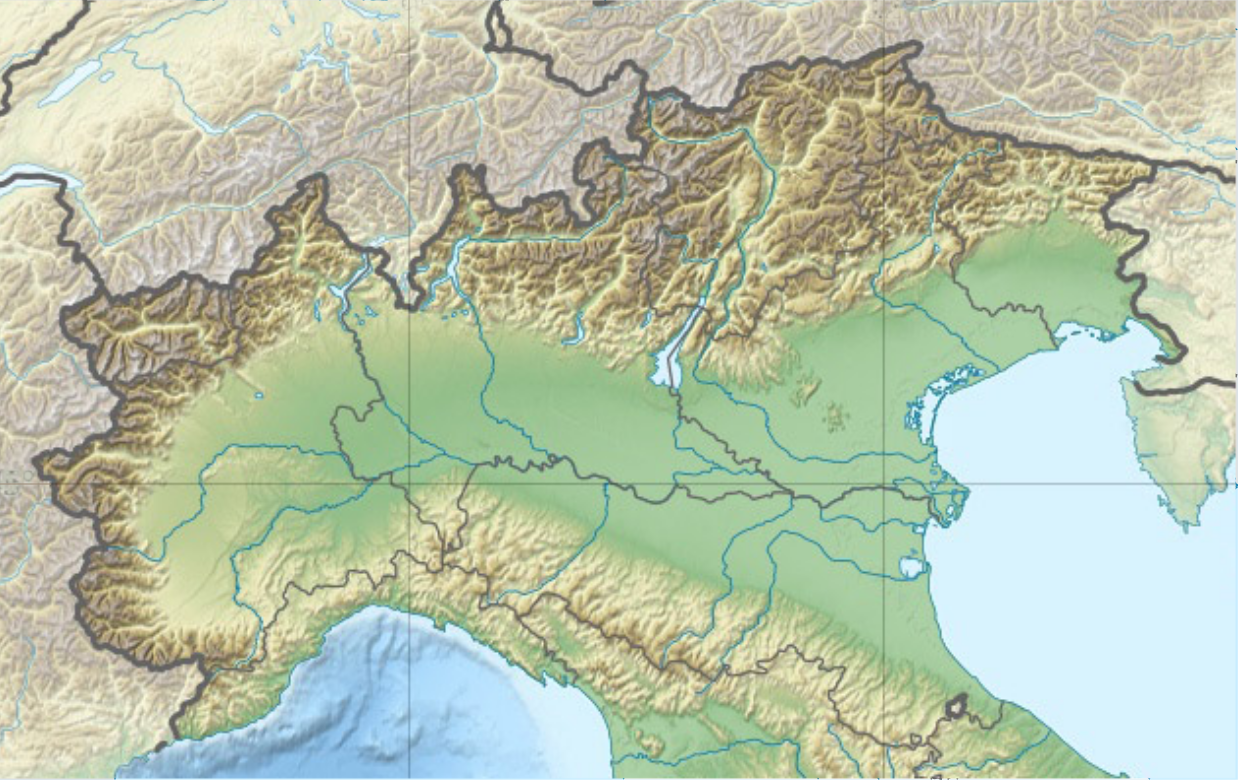
Northern Italy 1628 to 1631; key locations

Led by Charles Emmanuel, Savoyard forces captured Trino in April, then Nizza Monferrato in June, but the siege of Casale dragged on. The diversion of money and men from the war against the Dutch Republic weakened the Spanish position in Flanders and forced them onto the defensive. Philip later admitted attacking Casale was the one political act he regretted, but once committed Spanish prestige made it impossible to withdraw. Although Olivares accepted 'the duke of Nevers is the legitimate heir to all the Mantuan territories', Spain now recognised Guastalla as Duke of Mantua.

By mortgaging his French estates, Nevers was able to raise another 6,600 men, (Note: Other sources suggest 10,000) most of whom were ambushed and destroyed by Charles Emmanuel while crossing the Alps. The surrender of La Rochelle in October 1628 allowed France to intervene directly and in March 1629, an army led by Louis XIII stormed barricades blocking the Pas de Suse. By the end of the month, they had lifted the siege of Casale and taken the strategic Savoyard fortress of Pinerolo.

In April, France, England and Savoy signed the Treaty of Susa, facilitated by Cardinal Mazarin, the papal Nuncio. It consisted of two separate agreements, the first ending the Anglo-French War (1627–1629), the second making peace between France and Savoy. In return for Trino, Charles Emmanuel allowed French troops to garrison Casale and Pinerolo, as well as providing free passage across his territory to reinforce Mantua. Louis XIII and the bulk of the French army then returned to Languedoc to suppress the latest in a series of Huguenot rebellions.

== Phase II: June 1629 to October 1630 ==
Philip was determined to reverse the Susa treaty and replaced Córdoba with Ambrogio Spinola, a native of Genoa and former commander in the Spanish Netherlands. Nevers unwisely led 2,500 troops in an attack on Spanish-held Cremona, which his Venetian allies refused to support. Combined with the withdrawal of the main French army, this left him vulnerable to a counter-offensive. Richelieu positioned 18,000 troops on the Savoyard frontier to deter Imperial intervention, but Ferdinand viewed opposing the French in Italy as a higher priority than supporting Spain against the Dutch. The June 1629 Treaty of Lübeck that ended his war with Denmark-Norway allowed Ferdinand to send 30,000 troops from Germany under the Mantuan exile Ramboldo, Count of Collalto.

Hoping to overwhelm Casale and prevent interference by Charles Emmanuel, Spinola sought to expand his existing force of 16,000 with another 12,000 mercenaries and 6,000 reinforcements from Naples. He also invoked treaties with Tuscany and Parma to supply 4,000 and 2,000 men respectively but despite its size, his army contained many poor quality troops. Although Ferdinando II undertook to provide 6,000 men for two years along with use of the Tuscan navy, he ultimately avoided doing so. The siege of Casale and its French garrison of 2,500 resumed in June; in late October, Collalto dispersed a Venetian force of 7,000 before moving onto Mantua, held by a garrison of 4,000.

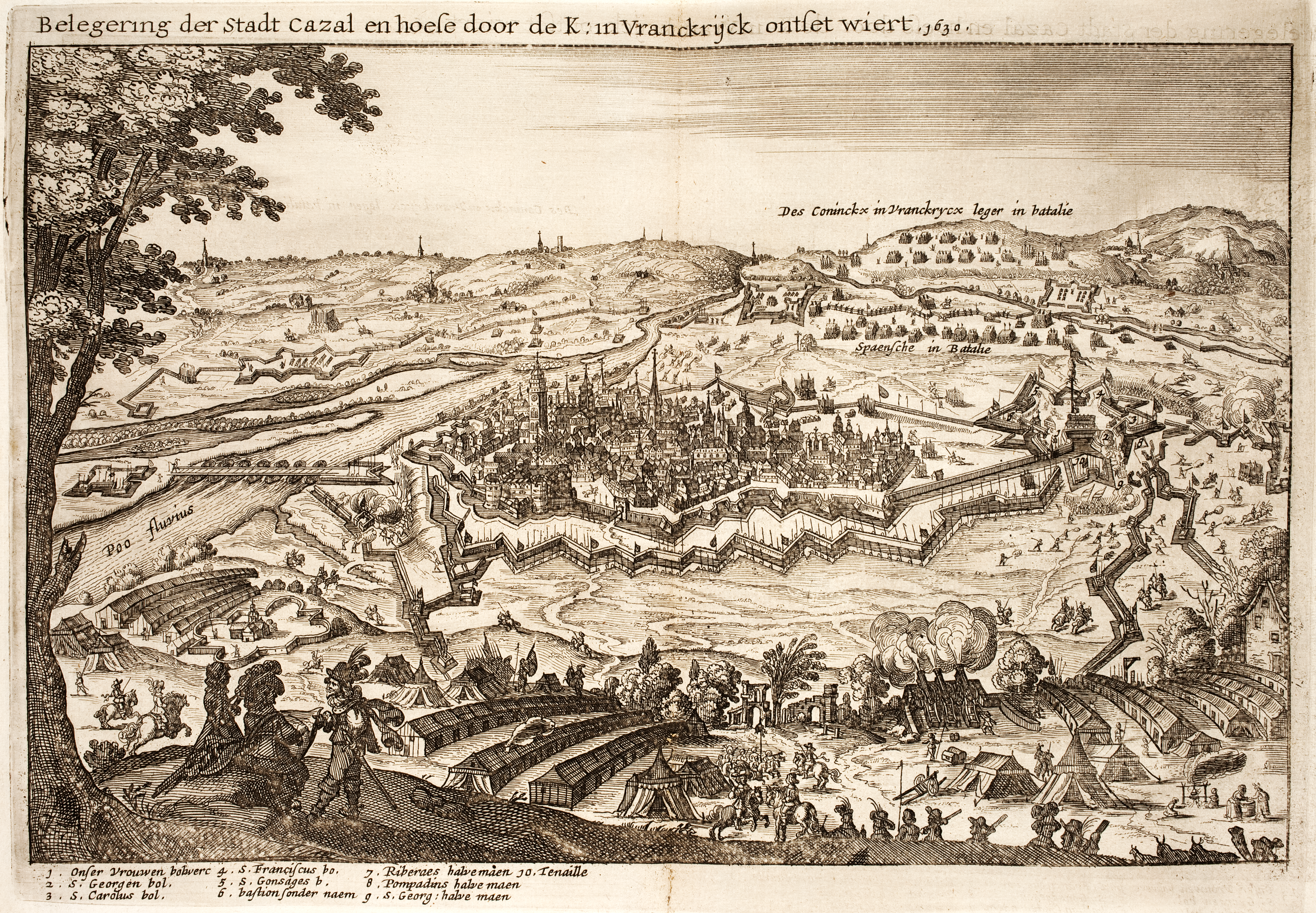
Siege of Casale Monferrato, 1630

Neither siege made much progress; Mantua was protected by two artificial lakes which made it difficult to position siege artillery and Collalto withdrew after an unsuccessful assault in late November. As Collalto fell ill, he left command to his deputies Gallas and Aldringen. Casale continued to hold out, while the Spanish were unable to pay or support so many men and large numbers were lost to desertion and disease. Charles Emmanuel switched sides again and in December joined Spinola at Casale with 6,500 men, leaving 12,500 to guard Piedmont and another 6,000 in Savoy, while Tuscany, Parma and other Spanish allies provided additional recruits and money. A French army of 18,000 under Henri II de Montmorency overran Savoy, before invading Piedmont in February 1630; on 10 July, he defeated a combined Savoyard-Spanish force at Avigliana.

Both sides were badly affected by an outbreak of bubonic plague, allegedly brought from Germany by French and Imperial soldiers. The "worst mortality crisis to affect Italy during the early modern period", approximately 35% of the population of Northern Italy died between 1629 and 1631. The increasing brutality of the war led to a number of massacres, most notably at Ostiglia in April 1630, when local bandits, or "Formigotti", cut off an Imperial foraging party and assaulted the nearby garrison in Ostiglia. After its defeat, Imperial troops retaliated by attacking the civilian population, with contemporary sources estimating the number killed as around 600, including women and children.

When the siege of Mantua resumed in May 1630, its defenders had been reduced by disease to under 2,000, while a hastily assembled and poorly equipped relief force of 17,500 Venetian auxiliaries was routed by the Imperials at Villabuona. With the mutinous and unpaid garrison down to only 700 effectives, it surrendered to Gallas and Aldringen on 18 July; the sack that followed reportedly produced booty worth over 18 million ducats. Plague and the sack combined to reduce the population of Mantua by over 70% between 1628 and 1631 and it took decades to recover.

Despite this, the retention of Casale meant Nevers' cause remained alive; on 26 July, Charles Emmanuel died and was succeeded by his son Victor Amadeus, who was married to Christine of France, Louis XIII's younger sister. On 6 August, Montmorency defeated the Savoyards at Carignano; losses from disease and desertion left him too weak to relieve Casale, but reinforcements under Charles de Schomberg reached the fortress in early October. The siege works were flooded by heavy rain while the besiegers had been reduced by plague to under 4,000, their casualties including Spinola; on 29 October, the Spanish finally withdrew and the two sides agreed a truce, negotiated by the papal representative Mazarin.

== Peace and its aftermath ==
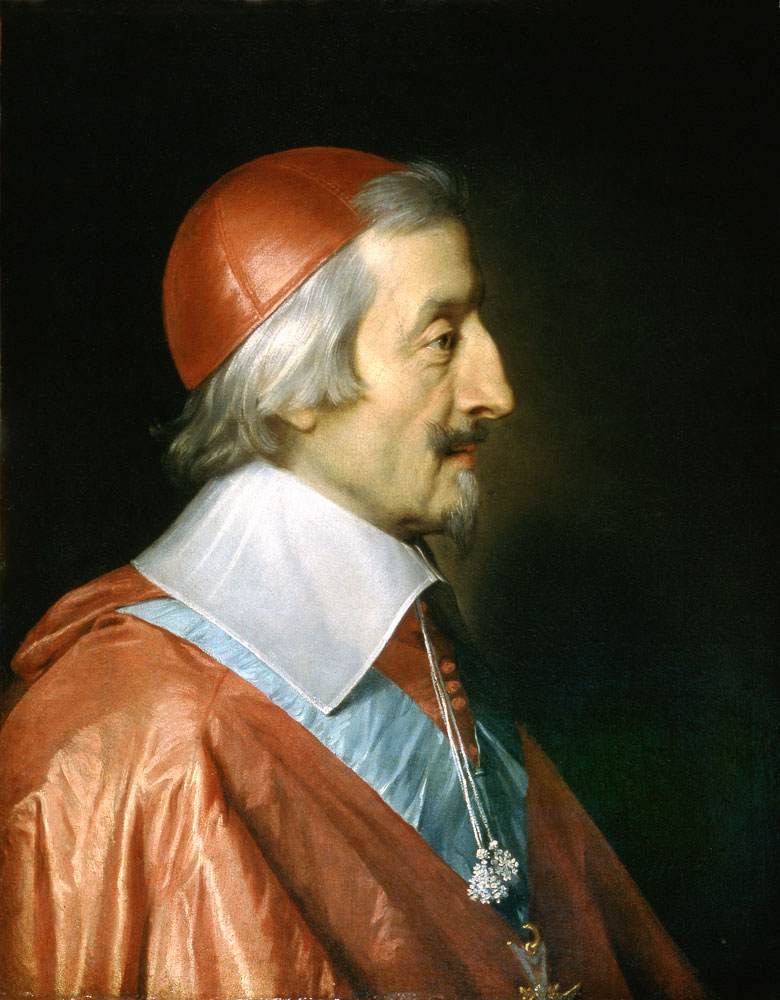
French chief minister Cardinal Richelieu; the war ultimately proved a major foreign policy success for France

In June 1630, Richelieu sent his deputies Father Joseph and Nicolas Brûlart to Regensburg, where they negotiations with Ferdinand who was attending a meeting of the Imperial Diet. At the same time, Gustavus Adolphus landed in Pomerania with 18,000 troops, beginning the Swedish intervention in the Thirty Years' War. Father Joseph also had secret instructions to seek an alliance with Ferdinand's main Catholic supporter, Maximilian I, Elector of Bavaria.

However, the loss of Mantua on 18 July appeared to jeopardise the French position in Italy, while Maximilian had no interest in an alliance. Seeing an opportunity, Ferdinand offered to confirm Nevers as Duke of Mantua, in return for France agreeing to cede Casale and Pinerolo to Spain, and withdraw support for Ferdinand's opponents within the Empire, ending French backing for both the Swedes and the Dutch. The offer coincided with Louis falling seriously ill and a concerted attack on Richelieu by his internal enemies, effectively paralysing the government. Unable to get a response to requests for further instructions, on 13 October Father Joseph reluctantly signed the Treaty of Ratisbonne.

The agreement undermined French foreign policy, which was to weaken the Habsburgs wherever possible, and their alliance with the Pope, who wanted to expel Spain from Italy. Having recovered from his illness, Louis refused to ratify the treaty, while Richelieu outlasted his opponents and resumed control over French policy, which lasted until his death in 1642. In January 1631 Louis provided Gustavus with financial backing in the Treaty of Bärwalde, allowing the Swedes to establish themselves in the Empire, where they would remain until 1648. It was followed in May by the Treaty of Fontainebleau, an eight-year pact of mutual assistance between France and Maximilian of Bavaria.

The need to transfer Imperial troops from Italy to face the Swedish threat forced Ferdinand to sign the Treaty of Cherasco with France on 19 June 1631, which confirmed Nevers as Duke of Mantua and Montferrat, in return for minor concessions to Savoy. Although both sides agreed to withdraw their armies, Nevers and Victor Amadeus allowed French garrisons to remain in Casale and Pinerolo, which meant despite the expenditure of 10 million escudos and thousands of men, Spain gained nothing from the conflict. The conflict ended favourably for France with Richelieu managing to strengthen the French position in Northern Italy, while disrupting the Spanish Road and damaging relationships between Spain and Austria. Of even greater long term significance was the split it created between the Habsburgs and the papacy, making it acceptable for France to employ Protestant allies against fellow Catholics.

== Sources ==
- Alfani, Guido; Percoco, Marco (2016). "Plague and long-term development: the lasting effects of the 1629–30 epidemic on the Italian cities" (PDF). The Economic History Review. 72 (4): 1175–1201. doi:10.1111/ehr.12652. ISSN 1468-0289. S2CID 131730725.
- Arnold, Thomas F. (1994). "Gonzaga Fortifications and the Mantuan Succession Crisis of 1613–1631". Mediterranean Studies. 4: 113–30.
- D'Arco, Carlo (1857). Due cronache di Mantova dal 1628 al 1631 la prima di Scipione Capilupi la seconda di Giovanni Mambrino (in Italian). Milano appresso Francesco Colombo.
- De Périni, Hardÿ (1896). Batailles françaises; Volume III, 1621-1643 (in French). Ernest Flammarion, Paris.
- Fagniez, G (1885). "LA MISSION DU PÈRE JOSEPH A RATISBONNE 1630". Revue Historique (in French). 27 (1): 38–67. JSTOR 40937243.
- Hanlon, Gregory (2016). The Twilight Of A Military Tradition: Italian Aristocrats And European Conflicts, 1560-1800. Routledge. ISBN 978-1138158276.
- Hanlon, Gregory (1998). Italy 1636: Cemetery of Armies. OUP. ISBN 978-0198738244.
- Kamen, Henry (2002). Spain's Road to Empire (2003 ed.). Allen Lane. ISBN 978-0140285284.
- Parker, Geoffrey, ed. (1984). The Thirty Years' War (1997 ed.). Routledge. ISBN 978-0-415-12883-4.
- Parrott, David (1997). "The Mantuan Succession, 1627–31: A Sovereignty Dispute in Early Modern Europe". English Historical Review. 112 (445): 20–65. doi:10.1093/ehr/CXII.445.20.
- Parrott, David (2001). Richelieu's Army: War, Government and Society in France, 1624–1642. Cambridge University Press. ISBN 978-0521792097.
- Portoguaro, Davide da (1979). Storia dei Cappucini Veneti Vol. 3, Curia Provinciale den FF.MM (in Italian). Curia Provinciale dei FF.MM a Venezia.
- Rebitsch, Robert (2006). Matthias Gallas (1588–1647). Generalleutnant des Kaisers zur Zeit des Dreißigjährigen Krieges. Eine militärische Biographie (in German). Münster: Aschendorff Verlag. ISBN 978-3-402065761.
- Rizzo, Mario (2005). "Sticks, Carrots and all the Rest: Lombardy and the Spanish strategy in Northern Italy between Europe and the Mediterranean (part. 1)". Cahiers de la Méditerranée (71): 145–184. doi:10.4000/cdlm.991.
- Stradling, R. A. (1990). "Prelude to Disaster; the Precipitation of the War of the Mantuan Succession, 1627–29". Historical Journal. 33 (4): 769–85. doi:10.1017/S0018246X00013753. S2CID 154817316.
- Thion, Stephane (2013). French Armies of the Thirty Years' War. Histoire et Collections. ISBN 978-2917747018.
- Wedgwood, C.V. (1938). The Thirty Years War (2005 ed.). New York Review of Books. ISBN 978-1-59017-146-2.
- Wilson, Peter H. (2009). Europe's Tragedy: A History of the Thirty Years War. Allen Lane. ISBN 978-0-7139-9592-3.
