= List of rulers of Mantua =

Coat of arms of the House of Gonzaga, the ruling family of Mantua for most of its history.

During its history as independent entity, Mantua had different rulers who governed on the city and the lands of Mantua from the Middle Ages to the early modern period.

From 970 to 1115, the Counts of Mantua were members of the House of Canossa. During its time as free commune and signoria ("lordship"), the Lords of Mantua were exponents of the Bonacolsi and Gonzaga families. From 1328, Mantua was informally led by Gonzagas until 1433, when Gianfrancesco Gonzaga assumed the noble title of Marquess of Mantua. In 1530, Federico II received the title of Duke of Mantua. In 1531, the family acquired the vacant Marquisate of Montferrat through marriage.

In 1627, Duke Vincent II deceased without heirs, ending the original line of Gonzagas. From 1628 to 1631, a succession war was fought between the Duke of Guastalla, supported by the Holy Roman Empire, and the Duke of Nevers, supported by France, for the control of the Duchy of Mantua. Finally, the Duke of Nevers was recognized as only Duke.

In 1708, Mantua was seized by the Habsburgs, ending Gonzaga rule. Montferrat's territories were ceded to the Duke of Savoy. The emperor compensated the Duke of Lorraine, heir in the female line of the Gonzaga, for the loss of Montferrat by ceding the Duchy of Teschen to the Lorraine. In 1745, Mantua was formally unified with the Duchy of Milan, until its dissolution in 1796.

== Counts of Mantua (970–1115) ==
=== House of Canossa ===
Portrait	Coat of Arms	Name	Reign		Relationship with Predecessor(s)	Marriage(s) Issue
		Adalbert Atto	970	13 February 988	• Son of Sigifred of Lucca	Hildegard of Supponids; 4 children
		Tebald	13 February 988	1007	• Son of Adalbert Atto	Willa of Tuscany; 2 children
		Boniface	1007	6 May 1052	• Son of Tebald	(1) Richelida Giselbertiner; Childless (2) Beatrice of Lorraine; 3 children
		Matilda	6 May 1052	24 July 1115	• Daughter of Boniface	(1) Godfrey of Lorraine; Childless (2) Welf of Bavaria; Childless

== Lords of Mantua (1272–1433) ==
Ghibellines Guelphs
Portrait	Coat of Arms	Name	Reign		Relationship with Predecessor(s)	Title
		Pinamonte dei Bonacolsi	28 July 1272	9 September 1291	• None	Rector
		Bardellone dei Bonacolsi	9 September 1291	2 July 1299	• Son of Pinamonte	Perpetual Rector
		Guido dei Bonacolsi	2 July 1299	21 January 1309	• Nephew of Bardellone	General Captain
		Rinaldo dei Bonacolsi	21 January 1309	16 August 1328	• Brother of Guido	General Captain
		Ludovico Gonzaga	16 August 1328	18 January 1360	• None; supported by Cangrande of Verona	Captain of the People
		Guido Gonzaga	18 January 1360	22 September 1369	• Son of Ludovico	Captain of the People
		Ludovico II Gonzaga	22 September 1369	4 October 1382	• Son of Guido	Captain of the People
		Francesco Gonzaga	4 October 1382	7 March 1407	• Son of Ludovico II	Captain of the People
		Gianfrancesco Gonzaga	7 March 1407	22 September 1433	• Son of Francesco	Captain of the People

== Marquesses of Mantua (1433–1530) ==
=== House of Gonzaga ===
Portrait	Coat of Arms	Name	Reign		Relationship with Predecessor(s)	Marriage(s) Issue
		John Francis I (Gianfrancesco I)	22 September 1433	25 September 1444	• Son of Francesco • Purchased the title from Emperor Sigismund	Paola Malatesta; 6 children
		Louis III (Ludovico III)	25 September 1444	11 June 1478	• Son of John Francis I	Barbara of Brandenburg; 11 children
		Frederick I (Federico I)	11 June 1478	14 July 1484	• Son of Lewis III	Margaret of Bavaria; 6 children
		Francis II (Francesco II)	14 July 1484	29 March 1519	• Son of Frederick I	Isabella d'Este; 9 children
		Frederick II (Federico II)	29 March 1519	8 April 1530	• Son of Francis II	Margaret Paleologa; 7 children

== Dukes of Mantua (1530–1708) ==
=== House of Gonzaga ===
Portrait	Coat of Arms	Name	Reign		Relationship with Predecessor(s)	Marriage(s) Issue
		Frederick II (Federico II)	8 April 1530	28 June 1540	• Son of Francis II (Title obtained by Emperor Charles V)	Margaret Paleologa; 7 children
		Francis III (Francesco III)	28 June 1540	21 February 1550	• Son of Frederick II	Catherine of Austria; Childless
		William (Guglielmo)	21 February 1550	14 August 1587	• Son of Frederick II	Eleanor of Austria; 3 children
		Vincent I (Vincenzo I)	14 August 1587	18 February 1612	• Son of William	(1) Margherita Farnese (nullified); Childless (2) Eleanor de' Medici; 6 children
		Francis IV (Francesco IV)	18 February 1612	22 December 1612	• Son of Vincent I	Margaret of Savoy; 3 children
		Ferdinand (Ferdinando)	22 December 1612	29 October 1626	• Son of Vincent I • Brother of Francis IV	Caterina de' Medici; Childless
		Vincent II (Vincenzo II)	29 October 1626	25 December 1627	• Son of Vincent I • Brother of Ferdinand and Francis IV	Isabella Gonzaga; Childless

=== House of Gonzaga-Nevers ===
Portrait	Coat of Arms	Name	Reign		Relationship with Predecessor(s)	Marriage(s) Issue
		Charles I (Carlo I)	17 January 1628	22 September 1637	• Grandson of Frederick II	Catherine of Lorraine; 6 children
		Charles II (Carlo II)	22 September 1637	14 August 1665	• Grandson of Charles I	Isabella Clara of Austria; 1 child
		Ferdinand Charles (Ferdinando Carlo)	14 August 1665	5 July 1708	• Son of Charles II	(1) Anna Isabella Gonzaga; Childless (2) Suzanne Henriette of Lorraine; Childless
