= Blood of Jesus Christ (military order) =

Religious military order

Order of the Redeemer
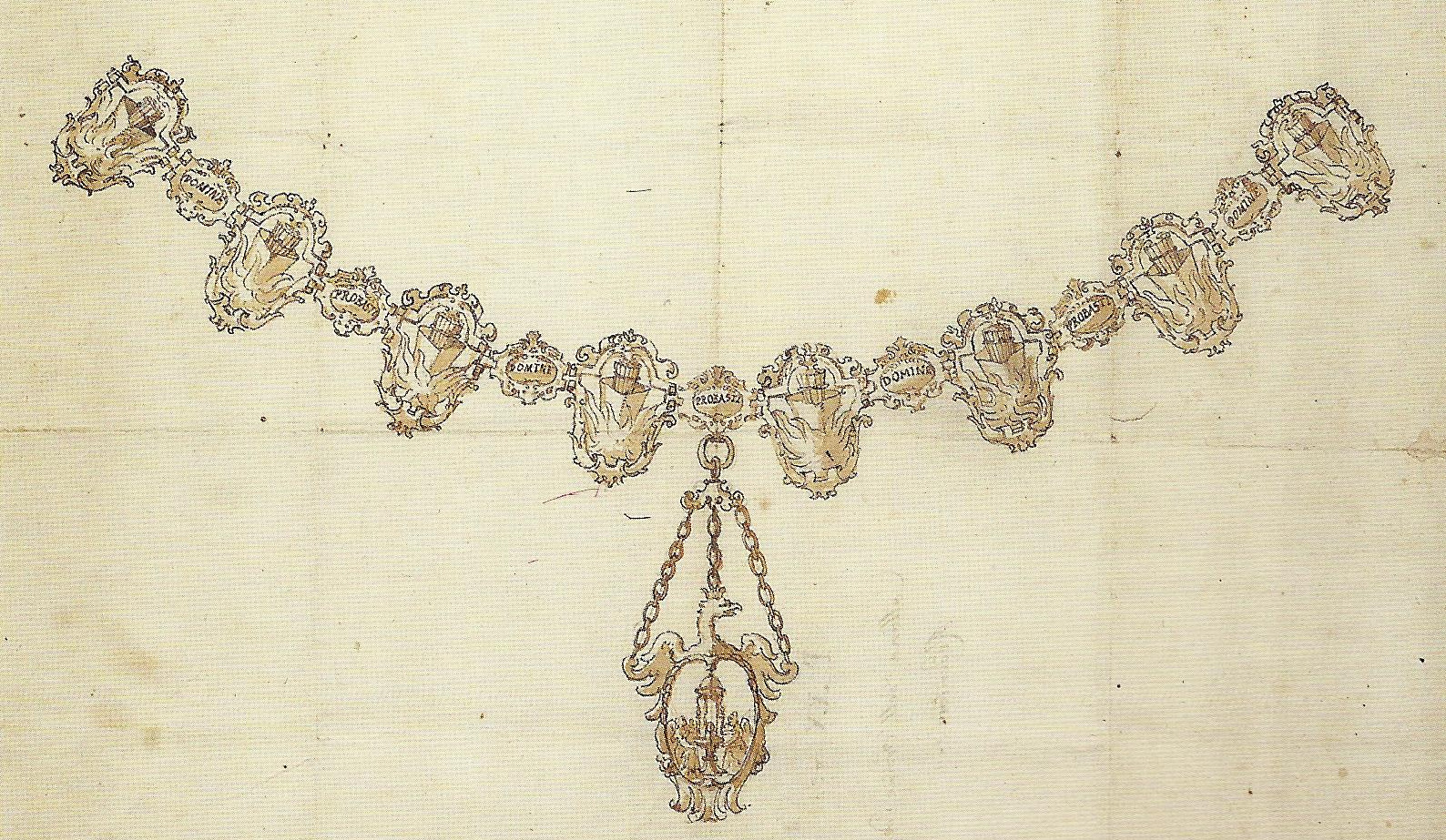

Awarded by Vincenzo I Gonzaga
- Type: Dynastic Order
- Motto: Domine probasti me, Nihil hoc triste recepto
- Awarded for: military and civil services
- Status: Currently constituted
- Duke of Mantua
- Grades: One

Statistics
- First induction: Francesco IV Gonzaga
- Last induction: Michele Sagramosi
- Total inductees: 104 knights

Precedence
- Next (lower): Order of the Immaculate Conception
- Riband of the Order of the Redeemer

Blood of Jesus Christ, or Blood of Christ, was a military order instituted at Mantua by Vincenzo I Gonzaga, Duke of Mantua, approved on 25 May 1608 by Pope Paul V. The motto of the order was Domine probasti me, or that Nihil hoc triste recepto. Jean Hermant speaks of the order and observes that it took its name from drops of the blood of Jesus, said to have been preserved in Saint Andrew's Basilica in Mantua. Their number was restricted to twenty besides the Grand Master; the office whereof was attached to himself and his successors.

There was also a congregation of nuns in Paris, France, called Blood of Jesus Christ, reformed from the Cistercians.

== History ==
Vincenzo I Gonzaga was a member of the chivalry equestrian order of Toson d'Oro. He had been given the honour of being part of this order of knighthood by the Grand Master Philip the second, King of Spain in 1589 after paying the enormous amount of 300,000 golden escudos. Not yet happy with that, he decided to fund his own equestrian order named "of the Redeemer" or " del Preziosissimo Lateral Sangue di Cristo", after the relic of the Holy Blood of Christ kept in Mantua. He took this decision, during the luxurious celebrations organized during the wedding of his first born son and heir and the Princess of the Savoy family. That new equestrian order was to represent the spirit of brotherhood. Its distinctive feature was a collar with golden medals chained one to the other. The medals showed two symbols alternatively: one medal showed the device of the melting pot surrounded by flames, where some golden bars were being melted while the other was decorated by the letters D.P., initial letters of the motto DOMINE PROBASTI ET COGNOVISTI ME taken from Psalm 139:1 ("O Lord thou hast searched me and known me"). Jesus of Nazareth. There was a pendant hanging from the collar, too. It was a golden medal showing two angels holding a reliquary with three drops of Christ's blood in it. The medal had the motto NIHIL ISTO TRISTE RECEPTO on it.

The members of this equestrian order used to wear vivid red outfits, wide in shape and long to the ground. The dress was then topped by a coat in the same colour with little flames scattered all over thus making their attire very remarkable and striking.

Today the head of the House of Gonzaga-Vescovato is Prince Maurizio Ferrante Gonzaga Vescovato and he is Grand Master of the Order of the Redeemer. The House of Gonzaga-Vescovato is the only branch of the Gonzaga dynasty that is still extant.

== Insignia ==
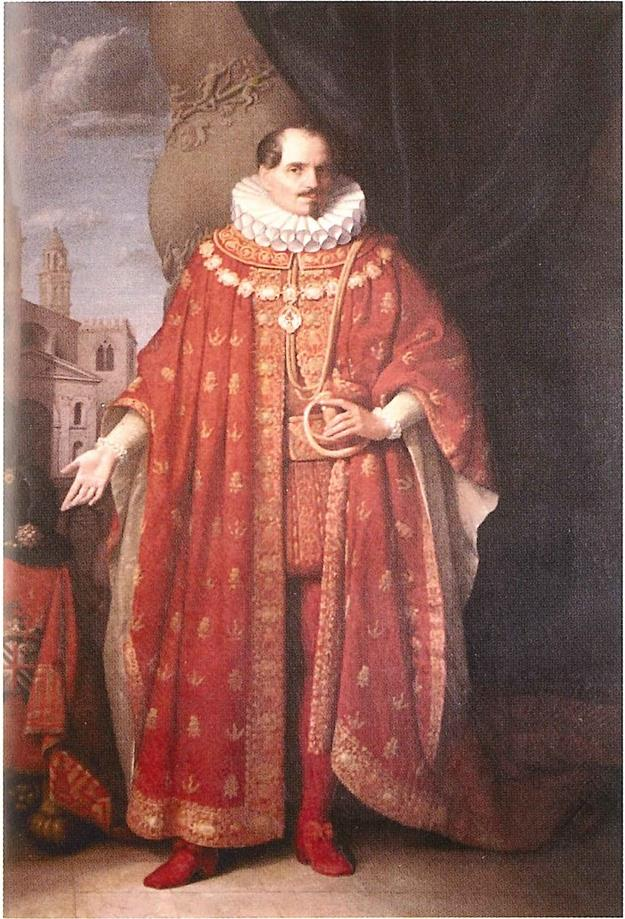
Portrait of Ferdinando Cavriani, 1st Marquess of Colcavagno. wearing the robe and collar of the Order.

Its distinctive feature was a collar with golden medals chained one to the other. The medals showed two symbols alternatively: one medal showed the device of the melting pot surrounded by flames where some golden bars were being melted, while the other was decorated by the letters D.P., initial letters of the motto DOMINE PROBASTI ET COGNOVISTI ME taken from Psalm 139:1 ("O Lord thou hast searched me and known me"). The badge of the Order, made of gold, hanged from this collar and showed two angels holding a reliquary with three drops of Christ's blood in it. The medal had the motto NIHIL ISTO TRISTE RECEPTO on it.

The members of this equestrian order used to wear vivid red outfits, wide in shape and long to the ground. The dress was then topped by a coat in the same colour with little flames scattered all lover thus making their attire very remarkable and striking.
