= Vincenzo II Gonzaga =

Vincenzo II
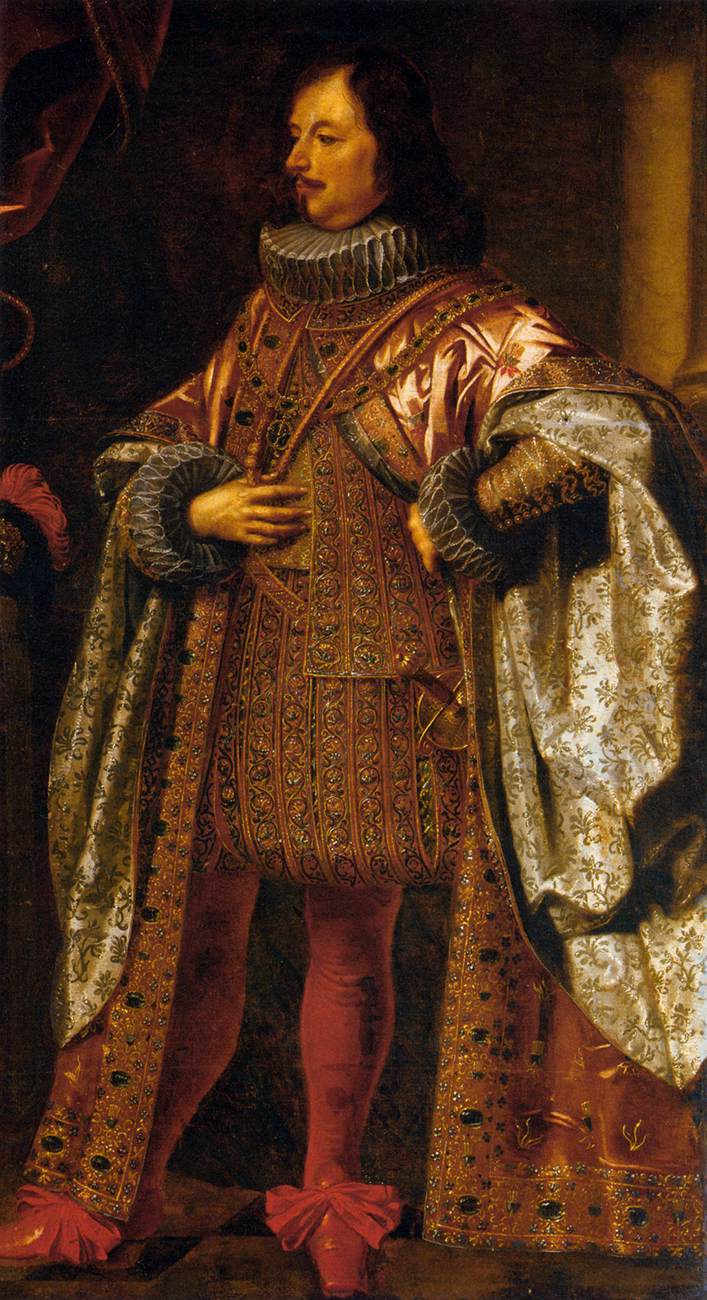

Duke of Mantua and Montferrat
- Reign: 29 October 1626 - 25 December 1627
- Predecessor: Ferdinando Gonzaga
- Successor: Charles I Gonzaga
- Born: 8 February 1594; Mantua, Duchy of Mantua
- Died: 25 December 1627 (aged 33); Mantua, Duchy of Mantua
- Burial: Basilica palatina di Santa Barbara
- Spouse: Isabella Gonzaga
- House: House of Gonzaga
- Father: Vincenzo I Gonzaga
- Mother: Eleonora de' Medici

Vincenzo II Gonzaga (8 February 1594 – 25 December 1627) was the Duke of Mantua and Duke of Montferrat from 1626 until his death.

Vincenzo was the son of Duke Vincent I and Eleonora de' Medici and inherited the duchy upon the death of his elder brother Ferdinand, receiving the imperial investiture on 8 February 1627.

He received a cardinalate in 1615 upon Ferdinando's succession, but did not travel to Rome to receive the red hat; the following year he married his relative Isabella Gonzaga, daughter of Alfonso Gonzaga, Count of Novellara, and the pope deprived him of his cardinalate.

He and Isabella did not have any children, and as the only surviving son, he was encouraged to take a new wife; however, the pope would not grant him a divorce. Isabella was then accused of witchcraft, but was found innocent; three men were later executed for trying to murder her.

Vincenzo also had problems with money and sold several of his paintings and valuables, particularly to the English King Charles I.

Conscious of his poor health, the childless Vincenzo set up an inheritance for his lands through the marriage of his niece Maria (daughter of the former Duke Francis IV) with Charles of Nevers' son Charles of Gonzaga-Nevers. The elder Charles was a cousin of his father. Vincenzo died on the marriage day of Maria and Charles.

== Family ==
Vincenzo II Gonzaga had no legitimate offspring from his wife, but he recognized four natural sons.

With Paola Scarpelli:

- Federico Gonzaga (1619–1630), Abbot of Lucledio.
- Tiberio Silvio Gonzaga (1620 – 3 July 1630), Knight of the Order of Malta and Balì of Armenia.

With Luigia "the Spanish":

- Luigi Gonzaga (+1627), died in infancy.
- Giovanni Gonzaga (+Malta 1645), Abbot of Lucledio, and Knight of the Order of Malta.

== Honours ==
- Grand Master of the Order of the Redeemer

== Ancestry ==
Ancestors of Vincenzo II Gonzaga

16. Francesco II Gonzaga, Marquess of Mantua
8. Federico II, Duke of Mantua
17. Isabella d'Este
4. Guglielmo X Gonzaga, Duke of Mantua
18. William IX, Marquess of Montferrat
9. Margaret Palaeologina
19. Anne of Alençon
2. Vincenzo Gonzaga, Duke of Mantua
20. Philip I of Castile
10. Ferdinand I, Holy Roman Emperor
21. Joanna of Castile
5. Archduchess Eleanor of Austria
22. Vladislas II of Hungary
11. Anna of Bohemia and Hungary
23. Anna of Foix-Candale
1. Vincenzo II Gonzaga, Duke of Mantua
24. Giovanni dalle Bande Nere
12. Cosimo I de' Medici, Grand Duke of Tuscany
25. Maria Salviati
6. Francesco I de' Medici, Grand Duke of Tuscany
26. Pedro Álvarez de Toledo, 2nd Marquis of Villafranca
13. Eleanor of Toledo
27. Maria Osorio
3. Eleonora de' Medici
28. Philip I of Castile (= 20)
14. Ferdinand I, Holy Roman Emperor (= 10)
29. Joanna of Castile (= 21)
7. Archduchess Joanna of Austria
30. Vladislas II of Hungary (= 22)
15. Anna of Bohemia and Hungary (= 11)
31. Anna of Foix-Candale (= 23)

Regnal titles
Preceded by Ferdinand	Duke of Mantua; 1626–1627	Succeeded by Charles I
Preceded by Ferdinand	Duke of Montferrat; 1626–1627	Succeeded by Charles I
