= Francesco IV Gonzaga =

Duke of Mantua and Montferrat in 1612

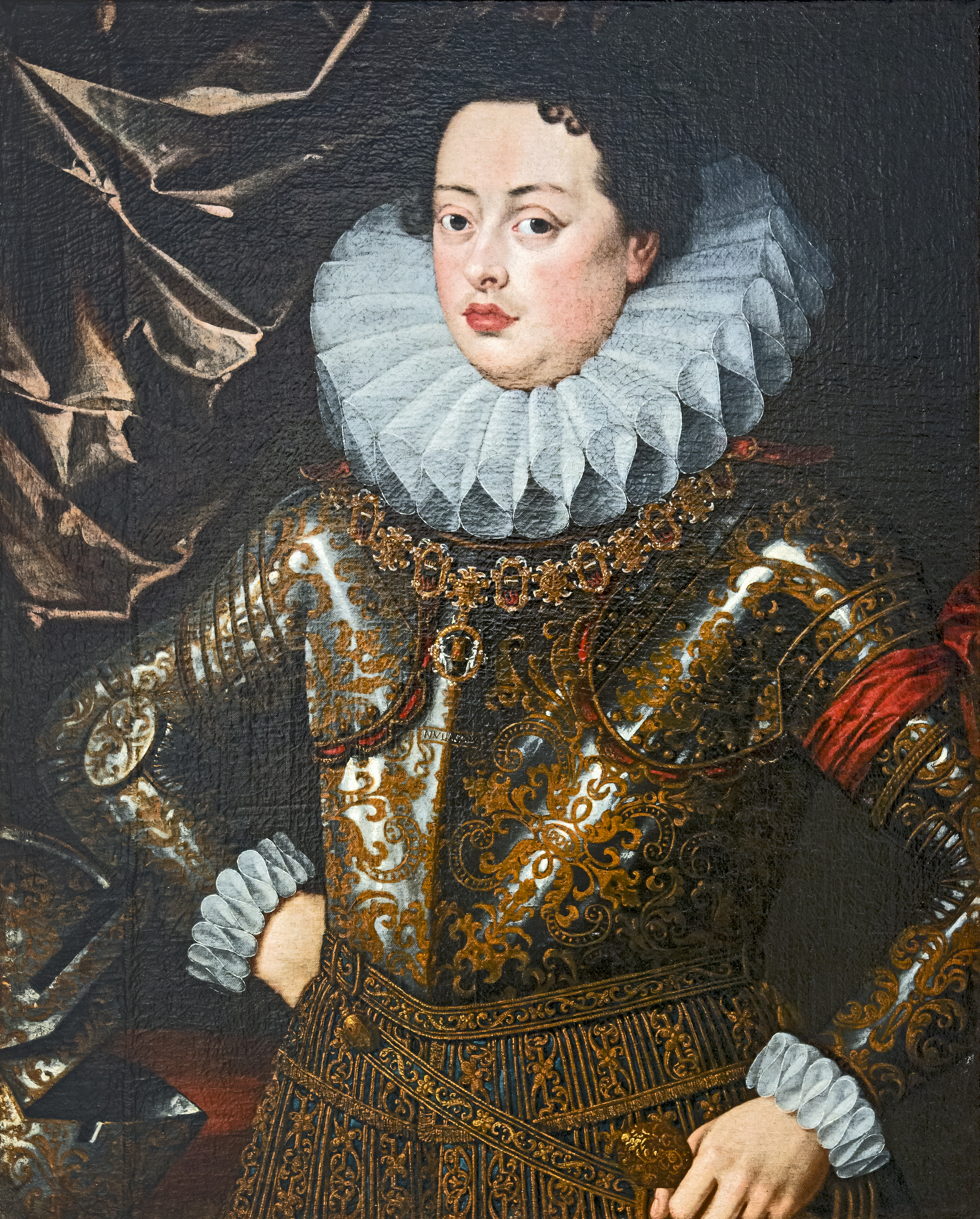
- Francesco IV Gonzaga

Duke of Mantua and Montferrat
- Reign: 9 February 1612 - 22 December 1612
- Predecessor: Vincenzo I Gonzaga
- Successor: Ferdinando Gonzaga
- Born: 7 May 1586; Mantua, Duchy of Mantua
- Died: 22 December 1612 (aged 26); Mantua, Duchy of Mantua
- Spouse: Margaret of Savoy (m. 1608)
- Issue: Maria Gonzaga
- House: Gonzaga
- Father: Vincenzo I Gonzaga
- Mother: Eleonora de' Medici

Francesco IV Gonzaga (7 May 1586 – 22 December 1612) was Duke of Mantua and Montferrat between 9 February and 22 December 1612.

== Biography ==
Born in Mantua, he was the eldest son of Duke Vincenzo I and Eleonora de' Medici.

In 1607, Claudio Monteverdi dedicated his opera L'Orfeo to Francesco. The title page of the opera bears the dedication "Al serenissimo signor D. Francesco Gonzaga, Prencipe di Mantoua, & di Monferato, &c."

Francesco became Duke upon his father's death on 9 February 1612. He died at Mantua on 22 December 1612 without male heirs. He was succeeded by his brother Ferdinand; however, Charles Emmanuel I, Duke of Savoy, the father of Francesco's wife Margaret of Savoy, disputed this, leading to the War of the Montferrat Succession (1613–1617).

== Family ==
On 19 February 1608 he married in Turin, Margaret of Savoy (1589–1655), daughter of Charles Emmanuel I, Duke of Savoy. They had:

- Maria (29 July 1609 – 14 August 1660); married in 1627 Charles II of Gonzaga, Duke of Rethel and Nevers.
- Ludovico (27 April 1611 – 3 August 1612).
- Eleanore (12 September 1612 – 13 September 1612).

== Honours ==
- Grand Master of the Order of the Redeemer

== Sources ==
- Bourne, Molly (2010). "The Art of Diplomacy: Mantua and the Gonzaga". In Rosenberg, Charles M. (ed.). The Court Cities of Northern Italy: Milan, Parma, Piacenza, Mantua, Ferrara, Bologna, Urbino, Pesaro, and Rimini. Cambridge University Press. p. 138-195.
- Bourne, Molly (2016). "From court to cloister and back again: Margherita Gonzaga, Caterina dé Medici and Lucrina Fetti at the convent of Sant'Orsola in Mantua". In Cavallo, Sandra; Evangelisti, Silvia (eds.). Domestic Institutional Interiors in Early Modern Europe. Routledge. p. 153-180.
- Raviola, Blythe Alice (2016). "The Three Lives of Margherita of Savoy-Gonzaga, Duchess of Mantua and Vicereine of Portugal". In Cruz, Anne J.; Stampino, Maria Galli (eds.). Early Modern Habsburg Women: Transnational Contexts, Cultural Conflicts. Routledge. p. 59-78.

Francesco IV Gonzaga House of Gonzaga Born: 7 May 1586 Died: 22 December 1612
Regnal titles
Preceded by Vincenzo I	Duke of Mantua; 1612	Succeeded by Ferdinando
Preceded by Vincenzo I	Duke of Montferrat; 1612	Succeeded by Ferdinando
