= Bonacolsi =

Italian noble family

- Founded: 1168
- Founder: Ottobuono de Bonacosa
- Final ruler: Rinaldo dei Bonacolsi
- Titles: Lord of Mantua
- Dissolution: 1349
- Deposition: 1328

The Bonacolsi was the name of an Italian noble family which ruled Mantua in the last quarter of the 13th century and the first quarter of the 14th. The Bonacolsi were the first lords of Mantua, preceding and creating the basis for the much more famous House of Gonzaga.

== History ==
Pinamonte Bonacolsi was appointed one of two rectors of the commune on 12 July 1272, at first for a period of two months, internal strife among the extended kinship groups of the commune having reached excessive violence and murder. Within a few months Pinamonte was able to accuse and exile his co-rector Federico da Marcaria and the podestà, and gather power into his own hands. A communal reform in 1274 gave him a new position, capitano del popolo, which Pinamonte soon assumed for life. Pinamonte pacified the city by exiling the most troublesome of the families, confiscating their goods, made peace among his neighbors, declared allegiance to the distant Emperor as a Ghibelline city; Mantua entered on a prosperous period.

On 29 September 1291, Pinamonte's son, Bardellone, unseated his father in a coup; putatively, Bardellone was co-governor with his father, but nothing further is heard about the father, who died officially unnoticed, 7 October 1293. Bardellone's brother Tagino was exiled to Ferrara, where he formed lasting ties with the Este. Bardellone replaced the commune's consiglio maggiore with a consiglio del signore, 2 July 1294.

Tagino's pardon and return from Ferrara in 1298 began a shift in Mantuan alliance from Verona to the Este in Ferrara, cemented by accords signed in Ferrara, 24 June 1299. Alberto I della Scala, lord of Verona, who favoured Bardellone's nephew Guido Bonacolsi, took immediate action and entered Mantua at the head of troops. Della Scala deposed and exiled Bardellone and Tagino, and installing as ruler of Mantua, Guido Bonalcolsi, who then married Alberto's recently widowed daughter Costanza at the beginning of September.

Statute of 1303 made Guido Bonacolsi captain-general of the city and comune of Mantua and gave him unlimited powers, combining the executive, legislative, fiscal and judiciary, to "impose bans, absolve and convict... make war, enter truces, concords and peace, acquire friends, contract alliances, receive and rehabilitate exiles, appoint, install, dismiss, acquit and convict the podestà, rectors, judges, assessors, and all other officials and administrators, grant or remove their salaries,, convene councils and assemblies such that no councils, assemblies or meetings may be held without his special license..." Guido died 24 January 1309, and was succeeded by his brother Rinaldo "Passerino", who had been an ally of Cangrande I della Scala.

The Gonzaga had initially been allies in the Bonalcosi takeover of Mantua, but now allied with the Scaliger family of Verona, rebelled. On 16 August 1328, Rinaldo, the last Bonacolsi, was overthrown in a revolt backed by Ludovico I of the House of Gonzaga.

Palazzo Bonacolsi (now Palazzo Castiglioni) that stands in piazza Sordello was commenced by Guido Bonacolsi as the Palazzo del Capitano. It was continued as the Palazzo Ducale by the Gonzaga.

A lesser member of the clan, the sculptor Pier Jacopo Alari Bonacolsi (c. 1460–1528), was nicknamed "L'Antico" by his contemporaries for his refined interpretation of the Antique.
