= Duchy of Mantua =

Former duchy in Northern Italy (1530–1708)

Coordinates: 45°09′37.3″N 10°47′49.2″E

Duchy of Mantua Ducato di Mantova (Italian) Ducatus Mantuæ (Latin)
- 1530–1797
- Coat of arms

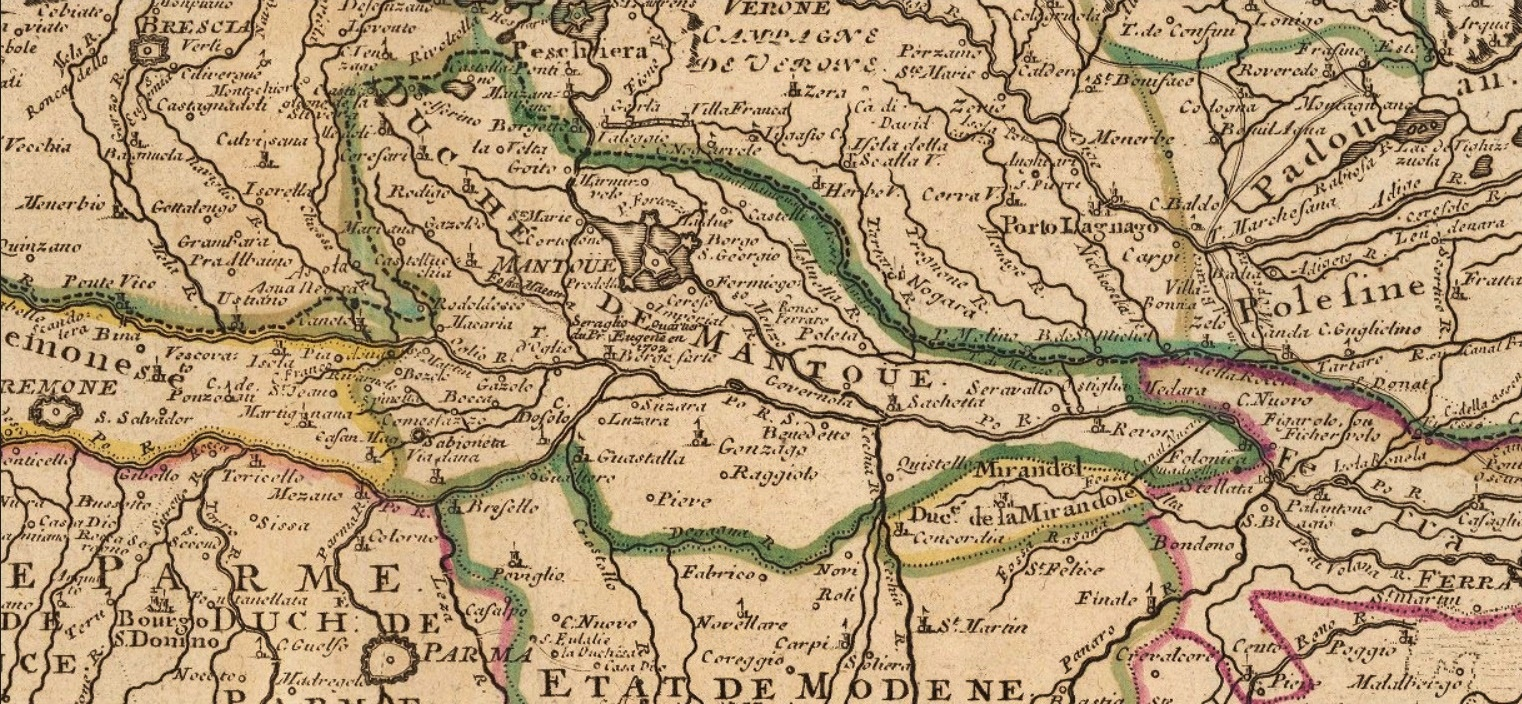
- The Duchy of Mantua in the early 18th century
- Capital: Mantua
- Common languages: Lombard; Italian; Latin
- Religion: Roman Catholicism
- Government: Princely hereditary monarchy
- Duke
  - 1530–1540: Federico II Gonzaga (first)
  - 1665–1708: Ferdinando Carlo Gonzaga
  - 1708–1797: Austrian Habsburgs (last)
- Historical era: Early Modern
  - Margraviate of Mantua is raised to Duchy: 8 April 1530
  - Gonzaga-Nevers' ascent to throne: 25 December 1627
  - Succession war: 1628–1631
  - Gonzaga rule ends - Partitioned and ruled by the Austrian Habsburgs: 1708
  - Annexed to the Duchy of Milan: 26 September 1786
  - Separated from the Duchy of Milan: 24 January 1791
  - Conquered by Napoleon - Disestablished: 1797
- Currency: Monetazione di Mantova
Preceded by	Succeeded by
Marquisate of Mantua	Habsburg monarchy
- Today part of: Italy

The Duchy of Mantua (Italian: Ducato di Mantova; Lombard: Ducaa de Mantua) was a duchy in Lombardy, northern Italy. Its first duke was Federico II Gonzaga, member of the House of Gonzaga that ruled Mantua since 1328. In 1531, the duchy also acquired the March of Montferrat, thanks to the marriage between Gonzaga and Margaret Paleologa, Marchioness of Montferrat.

The duchy's historic power and influence under the Gonzaga family made it one of the main artistic, cultural, and especially musical hubs of Northern Italy and the country as a whole. Mantua also had one of the most splendid courts of Italy and Europe in the fifteenth, sixteenth, and early seventeenth centuries.

In 1708, after the death of Ferdinando Carlo Gonzaga, the last heir of the Gonzaga family, the duchy was partitioned. The domains were divided between the House of Savoy, that obtained the remaining half of Montferrat, and the House of Habsburg, that obtained the city of Mantua itself.

== History ==
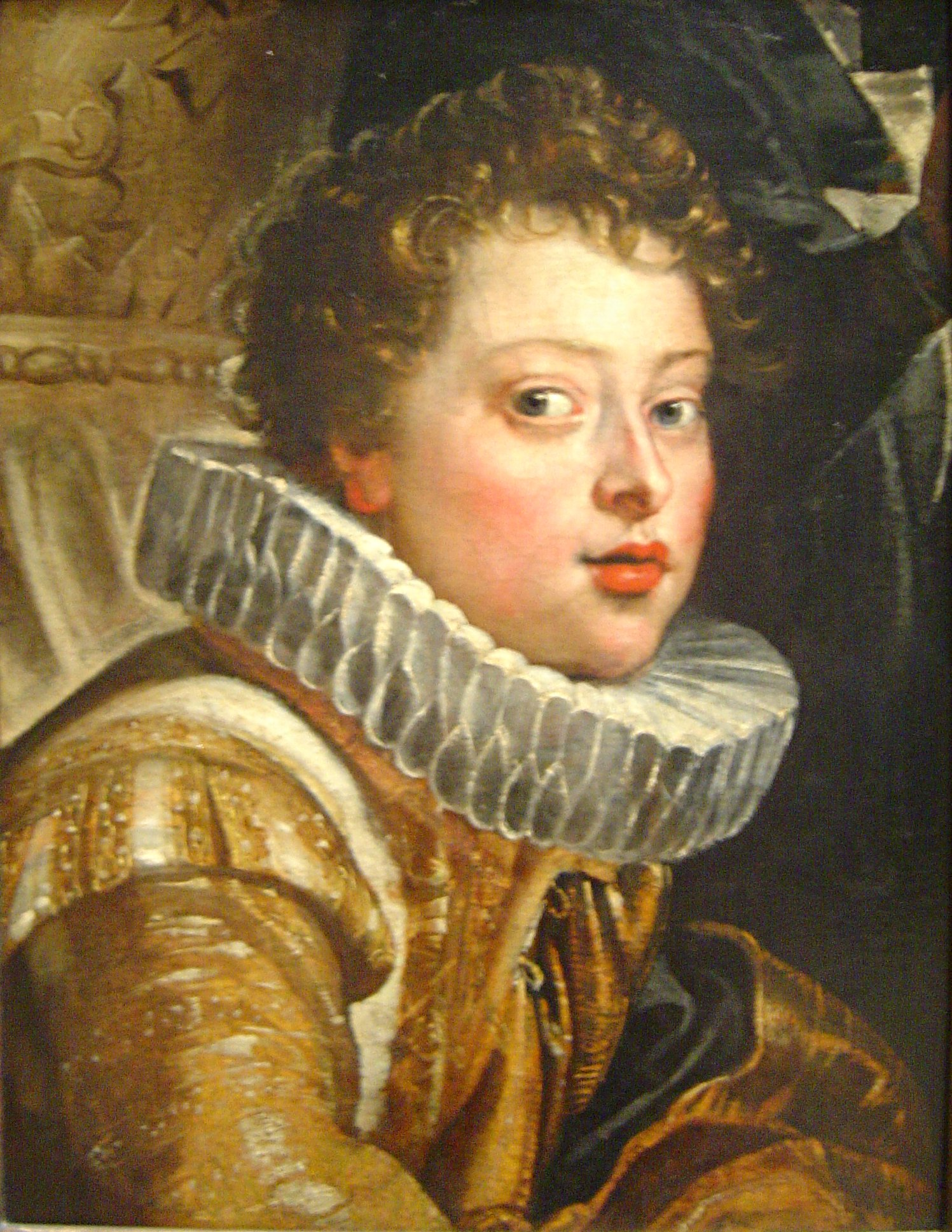
Vincenzo II Gonzaga, by Peter Paul Rubens

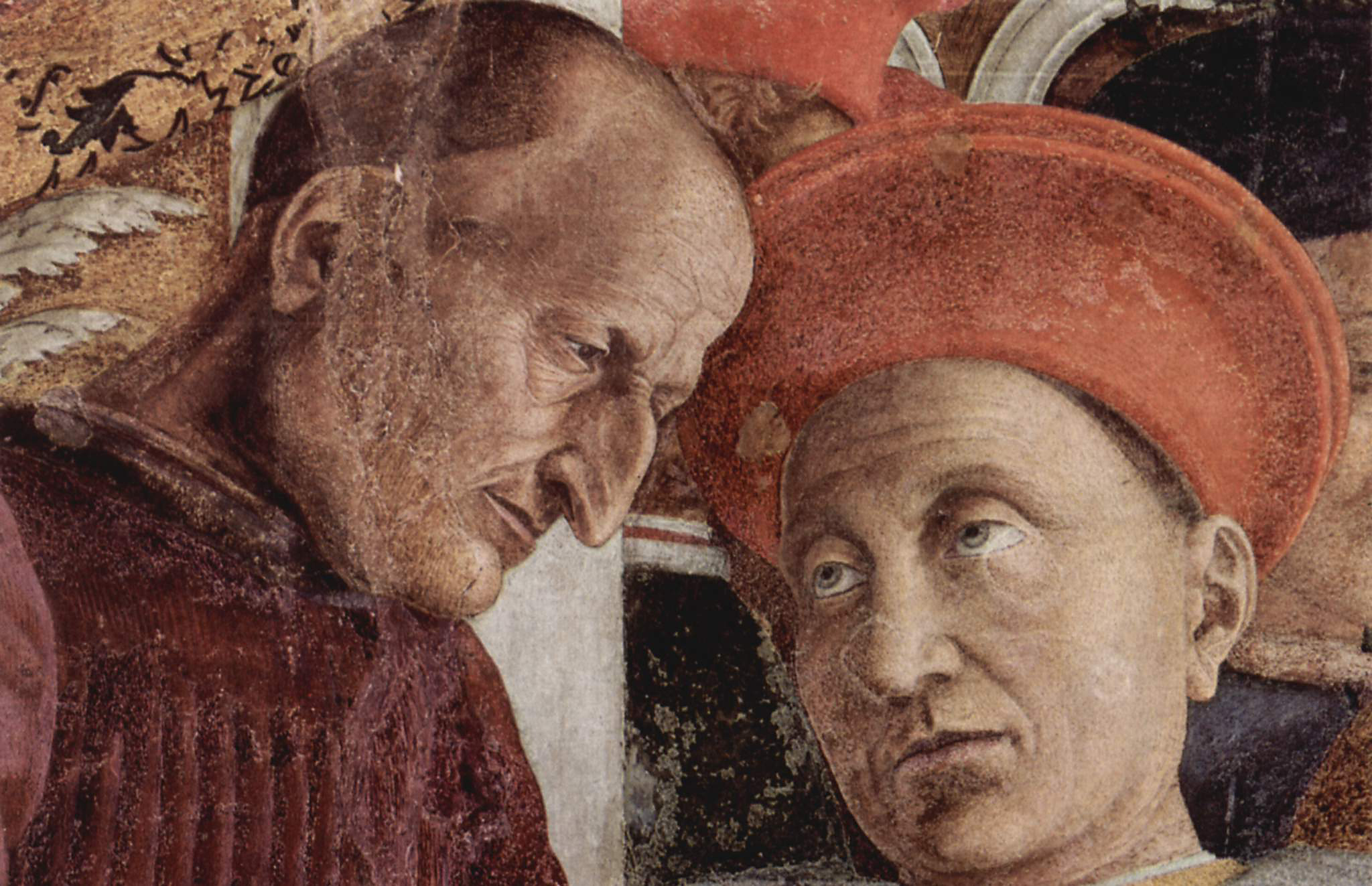
Ludovico III receiving the news of his son Francesco being elected cardinal, fresco by Andrea Mantegna in the Stanza degli Sposi of the Palazzo Ducale.

=== Background ===
After the fall of the Western Roman Empire, Mantua was invaded by Byzantines, Lombards and Franks. In the 11th century it became a possession of Boniface of Canossa, marquis of Tuscany. The last ruler of the family was the countess Matilde of Canossa (died 1115), who, according to legend, ordered the construction of the precious Rotonda di San Lorenzo (1082). After the death of Matilde of Canossa, Mantua became a free commune and strenuously defended itself from the Holy Roman Empire in the 12th and 13th centuries.

During the Investiture Controversy, Pinamonte Bonacolsi took advantage of the chaotic situation to seize power, as Captain General of the People, in 1273. His family, the Bonacolsi, ruled Mantua for the next century, making it more prosperous and artistically beautiful.

On 16 August 1328, the last Bonacolsi, Rinaldo, was overthrown in a revolt backed by the House of Gonzaga, a family of officials, namely the 60-year-old Ludovico and his sons Guido, Filippino and Feltrino. Ludovico, who had been podestà of the city in 1318, was elected capitano del popolo ("people's captain"). The Gonzaga built new walls with five gates and renovated the architecture of the city in the 14th century, but the political situation in the city did not settle until Ludovico II eliminated his relatives, seizing power for himself in 1370.

Through a payment of 120,000 golden florins in 1433, Gianfrancesco was appointed marquis of Mantua by Emperor Sigismund, whose great-niece Barbara of Brandenburg he married. In 1459 Pope Pius II held a diet in Mantua to proclaim a crusade against the Turks, which was known as the Council of Mantua.

=== The Duchy ===
The first duke of Mantua was Federico II, who acquired the title from Charles V, Holy Roman Emperor in 1530. The following year, the family acquired the Marquisate of Montferrat through marriage. Federico commissioned Giulio Romano to build the famous Palazzo Te, in the periphery of the city, and profoundly improved the city.

In 1624, Ferdinando Gonzaga moved the ducal seat to a new residence, the Villa La Favorita, designed by the architect Nicolò Sebregondi, in Porto Mantovano.

As many as eight hundred persons, including writers, artists, musicians, and even a troop of commedia dell'arte actors, enjoyed Gonzaga patronage in the early seventeenth century. In that time, the Gonzagas were patrons of the Flemish artist Peter Paul Rubens. The duchy also played a key role in the development of opera; Claudio Monteverdi lived there from about 1590 to 1612, and his L'Orfeo (1607) and other works were first presented there.

In 1625 Ferdinando Gonzaga founded the University of Mantua, where Jesuits taught humanities and philosophy, while laymen taught law and medicine. However, in order to pay for their splendid court, the Gonzaga family sold some of its assets, in 1627 Vincenzo Gonzaga sold the family collection of Renaissance paintings, including works of Titian, Andrea Mantegna, Correggio and Raphael to Charles I of England.

In 1627, the direct line of the Gonzaga family came to an end with the vicious and weak Vincenzo II, and the town slowly declined under the new rulers, the Gonzaga-Nevers, a cadet French branch of the family. The War of the Mantuan Succession broke out, and in 1630 an Imperial army of 36,000 Landsknecht mercenaries besieged Mantua, bringing the plague with them. Mantua never recovered from this disaster.

Duke Ferdinand Charles, an inept ruler whose only aim was to hold parties and theatrical representations, allied with France in the War of the Spanish Succession. After the latter's defeat in Italy, he was declared deposed by Emperor Joseph I and took refuge in Venice, carrying with him a thousand pictures. At his death, in 1708 his family lost Mantua forever to the Habsburgs of Austria. Montferrat's territories were ceded to the Duke of Savoy, and the Emperor compensated Leopold, Duke of Lorraine, heir in female line of the Gonzaga, for the loss of Montferrat by ceding him the Duchy of Teschen. The Gonzagas of the Duchy of Guastalla were passed over entirely despite having the strongest claim, themselves dying out in 1746, marking the end of the Gonzaga family.

Mantua was briefly united with the Duchy of Milan by an edict of Emperor Joseph II on 26 September 1786 but later restored in its separate administration by Emperor Leopold II on 24 January 1791. Mantua was besieged by Napoleon's French army in 1796, before falling in 1797. With the Treaty of Campo Formio, Mantua was annexed to the Cisalpine Republic becoming the Department of Mincio.

== See also ==
- Duke of Mantua
