= Guglielmo Gonzaga, Duke of Mantua =

Duke of Mantua and Montferrat (1538–1587)

Guglielmo Gonzaga
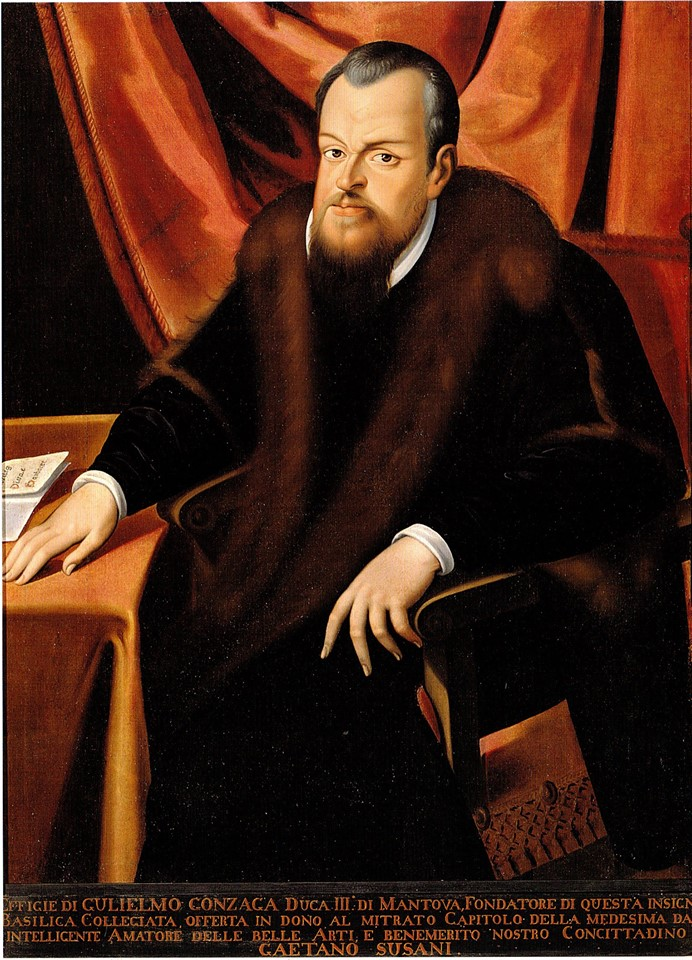
- 16th-century portrait

Duke of Mantua and Montferrat
- Reign: 22 February 1550 – 14 August 1587
- Predecessor: Francesco III Gonzaga
- Successor: Vincenzo I Gonzaga
- Born: 24 April 1538; Mantua, Duchy of Mantua
- Died: 14 August 1587 (aged 49); Goito, Duchy of Mantua
- Spouse: Eleonora of Austria (m. 1561)
- Issue: Vincenzo I, Duke of Mantua; Margherita Gonzaga; Anna Juliana Gonzaga
- House: Gonzaga
- Father: Federico II Gonzaga, Duke of Mantua
- Mother: Margaret Palaeologina

Guglielmo Gonzaga (24 April 1538 – 14 August 1587) was Duke of Mantua from 1550 to 1587, and of Montferrat from 1574 to 1587. He was the second son of Federico II Gonzaga, Duke of Mantua and Margaret Palaeologina of Montferrat. In 1574, Montferrat was elevated to a Duchy and Guglielmo became its first duke. He was succeeded as Duke of both duchies by his son Vincenzo.

== Patron of music ==
Guglielmo was particularly interested in sacred vocal music, and is known particularly to music historians for his extensive correspondence with the composer Giovanni Pierluigi da Palestrina. He built a large new church in Mantua, dedicated to Santa Barbara. He engaged in an unprecedented negotiation with the Papacy to create his own rite for Mantua, and devoted considerable resources to developing a musical repertoire for the church, commissioning works by Giaches de Wert and Palestrina. Part of his correspondence with Palestrina discusses the work commissioned in detail, stipulating Guglielmo's requirements, and therefore giving a sense of his musical preferences. Guglielmo's musical tastes were conservative for the day. He enjoyed imitative contrapuntal music but was concerned to maintain clarity of text, thereby showing the influence of Tridentine reforms. Upon his death, his son Vincent invited followers of the more modern trends to his court.

Three months before his death, Gonzaga wounded the organist of the ducal basilica, Ruggier Trofeo, in an encounter over a woman; the latter survived his injuries.

== Marriage and children ==
On 26 April 1561 William married Eleonora of Austria, sixth daughter of Ferdinand I, Holy Roman Emperor and Anna of Bohemia and Hungary. They had:

- Vincenzo I (21 September 1562 – 9 February 1612). Married Eleonora de' Medici
- Margherita Barbara Gonzaga (27 May 1564 – 6 January 1618). Married Alfonso II d'Este
- Anna Caterina Gonzaga (17 January 1566 – 3 August 1621). Married her maternal uncle Ferdinand II, Archduke of Austria

== Ancestry ==
Ancestors of Guglielmo Gonzaga, Duke of Mantua

16. Ludovico III Gonzaga, Marquis of Mantua
8. Federico I Gonzaga, Marquess of Mantua
17. Barbara of Brandenburg
4. Francesco II Gonzaga, Marquess of Mantua
18. Albert III, Duke of Bavaria
9. Margaret of Bavaria
19. Anna of Brunswick-Grubenhagen-Einbeck
2. Federico II Gonzaga, Duke of Mantua
20. Niccolò III d'Este, Marquis of Ferrara
10. Ercole I d'Este, Duke of Ferrara
21. Ricciarda, Marchioness of Saluzzo
5. Isabella d'Este
22. Ferdinand I of Naples
11. Eleanor of Naples
23. Isabella of Clermont
1. Guglielmo Gonzaga, Duke of Mantua
24. John Jacob, Marquess of Montferrat
12. Boniface III, Marquess of Montferrat
25. Joanna of Savoy
6. William IX, Marquess of Montferrat
26. Stefan Branković, Despot of Serbia
13. Maria of Serbia
27. Angelina of Serbia
3. Margaret Paleologa
28. Jean II, Duke of Alençon
14. René, Duke of Alençon
29. Marie of Armagnac
7. Anne d'Alençon
30. Frederick II, Count of Vaudémont
15. Margaret of Lorraine
31. Yolande, Duchess of Lorraine

== Sources ==
- Parrott, David (1997). "The Mantuan Succession, 1627–31: A Sovereignty Dispute in Early Modern Europe". The English Historical Review. CXII, Issue 445, February (445). Oxford Academic: 20–65. doi:10.1093/ehr/CXII.445.20.

Guglielmo Gonzaga, Duke of Mantua House of Gonzaga Born: 24 April 1538 Died: 14 August 1587
Regnal titles
Preceded by Francesco III	Duke of Mantua; 1550–1587	Succeeded by Vincenzo I
Preceded by Francesco III	Marquess and Duke of Montferrat; 1550–1574–1587	Succeeded by Vincenzo I
