= Margaret Paleologa =

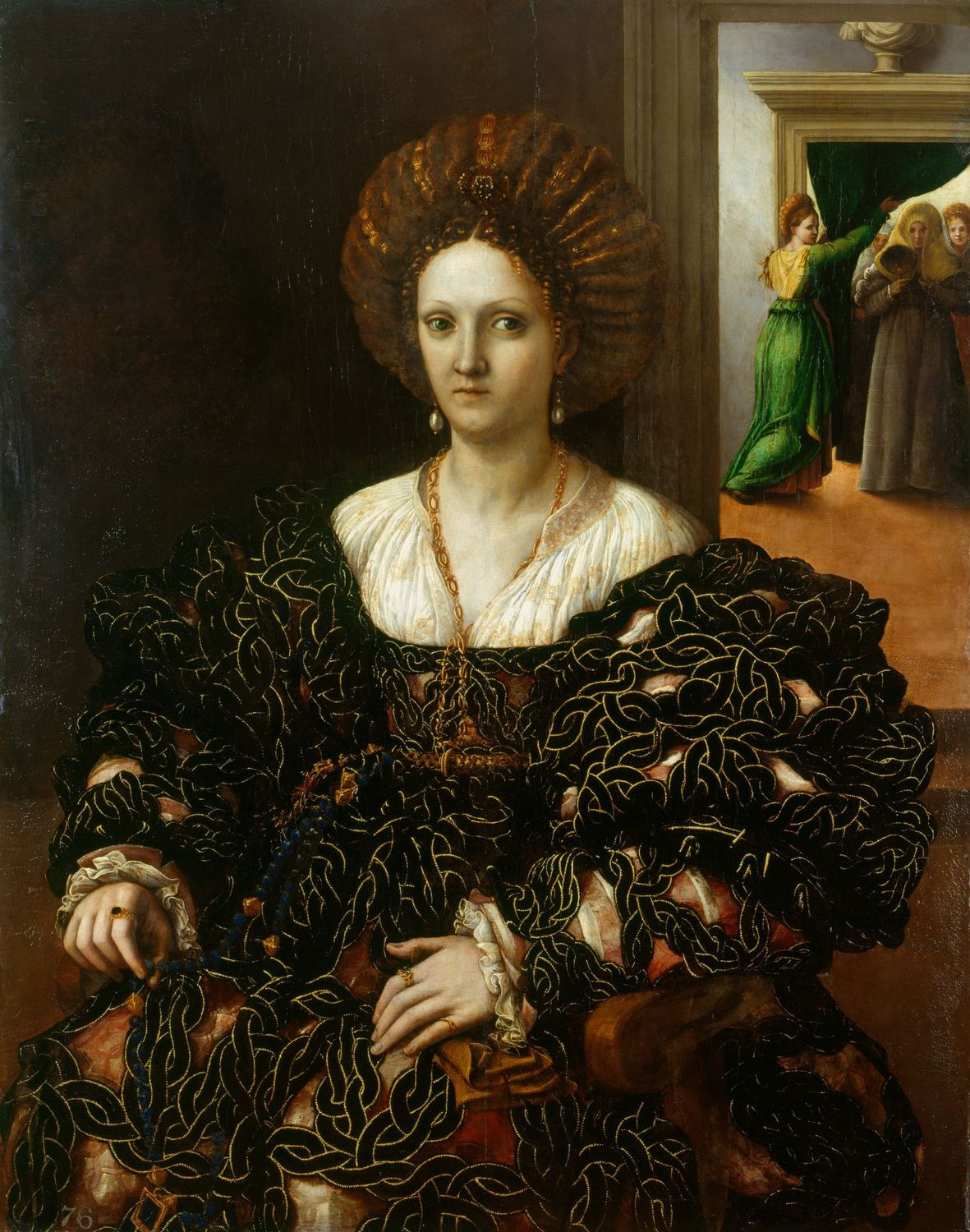
- Portrait by Giulio Romano believed to depict Margaret Paleologa (c. 1531), the Royal Collection

Marchioness of Montferrat
- Reign: 1533–1536
- Predecessor: John Georg Palaiologos
- Successor: Federico II Gonzaga
- Born: 11 August 1510; Casale Monferrato
- Died: 28 December 1566 (aged 56); Mantua, Duchy of Mantua
- Spouse: Federico II Gonzaga, Duke of Mantua
- Issue: Francesco III Gonzaga, Duke of Mantua; Isabella Gonzaga; Guglielmo Gonzaga, Duke of Mantua; Louis Gonzaga, Duke of Nevers; Federico Gonzaga
- House: Palaeologus-Montferrat
- Father: William IX of Montferrat
- Mother: Anne of Alençon
- Religion: Roman Catholicism

Margaret Palaeologa (Italian: Margherita Paleologa; 11 August 1510 – 28 December 1566), was the marchioness of Montferrat in her own right between 1533 and 1536. She was also Duchess of Mantua by marriage to Federico II, Duke of Mantua. Margaret acted as the regent of the duchy of Mantua twice during the minority of her sons: for her elder son Francesco III Gonzaga, Duke of Mantua in 1540–1549, and for her younger son Guglielmo Gonzaga, Duke of Mantua, between 1550 and 1556.

== Early life ==
Margaret was born in Casale to William IX of Montferrat and his wife Anne of Alençon.

Margaret was the second of three children. Her elder sister was Maria Paleologa, who died when she was 21 years of age, and her younger brother was Boniface IV of Montferrat, who died when he was only 18 years of age.

== Marriage ==
In 1517, Margaret's elder sister, Maria, was betrothed to Federico II Gonzaga, son of Francesco II Gonzaga and Isabella d'Este, who later became Marquis and Duke of Mantua. (Note: Hickson states that a "marriage" ceremony took place but the legality of the ceremony owing to Maria's age(6) made it questionable.) The marriage contract was annulled in 1529. Federico's attentions turned to Margaret. Having weighed up the various proposals for Margaret's hand, her mother Anne d'Alençon opted for the link with the House of Gonzaga and the marriage was concluded in October 1531. The marriage lasted for nine years until Federico's death, at the age of 40. The couple's last child was born the year of his death.

In 1533, Margaret inherited the title Marquise of Montferrat from her uncle John George, Marquis of Montferrat. However, in practice, her realm was under Spanish occupation at the time. In 1536, her husband was made ruling Marquis of Montferrat by right of his marriage to her.

== Regent of Mantua ==
On Federico's death in 1540, their eldest son, Francesco became Duke of Mantua as well as Marquis of Montferrat. As Francesco was still only a minor aged eight, Margaret acted as his regent.

Margaret had her son married to Catherine, daughter of Ferdinand I, Holy Roman Emperor and Anna of Bohemia and Hungary. Margaret had her second son, Guglielmo married to Catherine's younger sister, Eleanor. Francesco died one year after his marriage to Catherine in 1550, and no children were born to their union.

Margaret's second son Guglielmo then became Duke of Mantua. Margaret acted as his regent, with the help of her brother-in-law Cardinal Ercole Gonzaga. As regent, Margaret issued laws and regulations which benefitted the economy of Mantua by the establishment of businesses. She made improvements on the river harbour and had the fortifications and defence of the Duchy strengthened. In her foreign policy, she was pro-Spanish, which caused the French king to occupy Montferrat in 1555 – it was to be held by France until the Treaty of Cambresis in 1559.

Her regency was terminated when her son came of age in 1556.

Margaret died in Mantua on 28 December 1566.

In 1574, Margaret's homeland of Montferrat became part of the Duchy of Mantua, after the death of Margaret's son. In Montferrat, Guglielmo was known as Guglielmo X.

== Issue ==
Margaret and Federico had:

- Francesco III Gonzaga, Duke of Mantua (March 10, 1533 – February 22, 1550), died 16 years old.
- Eleonora Gonzaga, born and died in 1535.
- Anna Gonzaga, born and died in 1536.
- Isabella Gonzaga (1537–1579). Married Francesco Ferdinando d'Ávalos
- Guglielmo Gonzaga, Duke of Mantua (April 24, 1538 – August 14, 1587). Married Archduchess Eleanor of Austria
- Louis Gonzaga, Duke of Nevers (October 22, 1539 – October 23, 1595). Married Henriette of Cleves, by whom he had issue, including Charles I, Duke of Mantua.
- Alessandro
- Cardinal Federico Gonzaga (1540 – February 21, 1565)

== Ancestry ==
Ancestors of Margaret Paleologa

16. Theodore II, Marquess of Montferrat
8. John Jacob, Marquess of Montferrat
17. Joanna Montbéliard of Bar
4. Boniface III, Marquess of Montferrat
18. Amadeus VII, Count of Savoy
9. Joan of Savoy
19. Bonne of Valois-Berry
2. William IX, Marquess of Montferrat
20. Đurađ Branković
10. Stefan III Brankovic, despot of Serbia
21. Irene Kantakouzene
5. Maria of Serbia
22. Gjergj Arianiti
11. Angelina Arianiti
23. Maria Muzaka
1. Margaret Palaiologa of Montferrat
24. Jean I of Valois, duke of Alençon
12. Jean II of Valois, duke of Alençon
25. Marie Dreux-Montfort of Brittany
6. René of Valois, duke of Alençon
26. John IV, Count of Armagnac
13. Marie of Armagnac
27. Isabella of Evreux
3. Anna of Valois-Alençon
28. Antoine of Lorraine, count of Vaudémont
14. Frederick II of Lorraine, count of Vaudemont
29. Marie, Countess of Harcourt
7. Margaret of Lorraine
30. René of Valois-Anjou, duke of Bar
15. Yolande of Valois-Anjou
31. Isabella of Châtenois

== Sources ==
- Boltanski, Ariane (2006). Les Ducs de Never et L'Etat Royal (in French). Librairie Droz S.A.
- Antenhofer, Christina (2011). "From Local "Signori" to European High Nobility: The Gonzaga Family Networks in the Fifteenth Century". In Johnson, Christopher H.; Teuscher, Simon; Sabean, David Warren; Trivellato, Francesca (eds.). Transregional and Transnational Families in Europe and Beyond: Experiences. Berghahn Books.
- Bertelli, Sergio (2001). The King's Body: Sacred Rituals of Power in Medieval and Early Modern Europe. Translated by Litchfield, R. Burr. Pennsylvania State University Press.
- Commire, Anne; Klezmer, Deborah, eds. (1999). Women in World History. Vol. Gab–Harp. Yorkin Publications.
- Hickson, Sally Anne (2016). Women, Art and Architectural Patronage in Renaissance Mantua: Matrons, Mystics, and Monasteries. Routledge.

Margaret Paleologa Palaeologus-Montferrat Cadet branch of the Palaiologos dynasty Born: 11 August 1510 Died: 28 December 1566
Regnal titles
Preceded by John George, Marquis of Montferrat	Marchioness of Montferrat; 1533–1540	Succeeded by Francesco III Gonzaga
