= Federico Gonzaga (cardinal) =

Italian Roman Catholic cardinal

- Bishop of Mantua
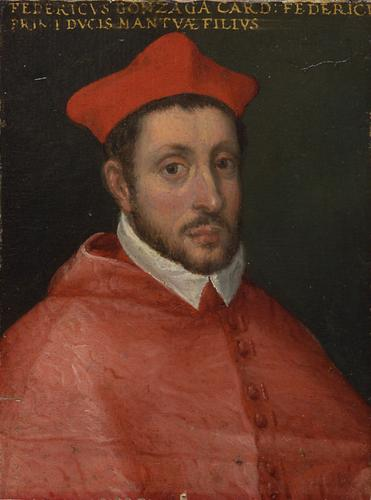
- Church: Catholic Church
- Diocese: Diocese of Mantua
- In office: 16 October 1564 – 21 February 1565
- Predecessor: Ercole Gonzaga
- Successor: Francesco Gonzaga
- Other post: Cardinal-Priest of Santa Maria Nova (1563-1565)
- Previous post: Apostolic Administrator of Mantua (1563-1564)

Orders
- Created cardinal: 6 January 1563 by Pope Pius IV

Personal details
- Born: July 1540 Mantua, Duchy of Mantua
- Died: 21 February 1565 (aged 24) Mantua, Duchy of Mantua

Federico Gonzaga, Cardinal of Monferrato (1540 – 21 February 1565) was an Italian Roman Catholic cardinal and bishop.

== Biography ==
A member of the House of Gonzaga, Gonzaga was born in Mantua, Italy in 1540. He was the posthumous son of Federico II Gonzaga, Duke of Mantua. His mother was Margaret Paleologa. He was the nephew of Cardinal Ercole Gonzaga. He was educated at the University of Bologna.

Pope Pius IV made him a cardinal priest in the consistory of 6 January 1563. He received the red hat and the titular church of Santa Maria Nova (a deaconry raised pro illa vice to the status of title) on 4 March 1563.

On 4 June 1563 he became administrator of the Diocese of Mantua, with dispensation for not having reached the canonical age. He was the papal legate in Mantua in 1564. He was granted the title of Bishop of Mantua on 16 October 1564 but never received consecration as a bishop.

He died in Mantua on 21 February 1565. He was buried in Mantua Cathedral.

== Ancestry ==
Ancestors of Federico Gonzaga (cardinal)

8. Federico I Gonzaga, Marquess of Mantua
4. Francesco II Gonzaga, Marquess of Mantua
9. Margaret of Bavaria
2. Federico II Gonzaga, Duke of Mantua
10. Ercole I d'Este, Duke of Ferrara
5. Isabella d'Este
11. Eleanor of Naples
1. Federico Gonzaga
12. Boniface III, Marquess of Montferrat
6. William IX, Marquess of Montferrat
13. Maria of Serbia
3. Margaret Paleologa
14. René, Duke of Alençon
7. Anne d'Alençon
15. Margaret of Lorraine
