= Anne of Alençon =

Anne d'Alençon
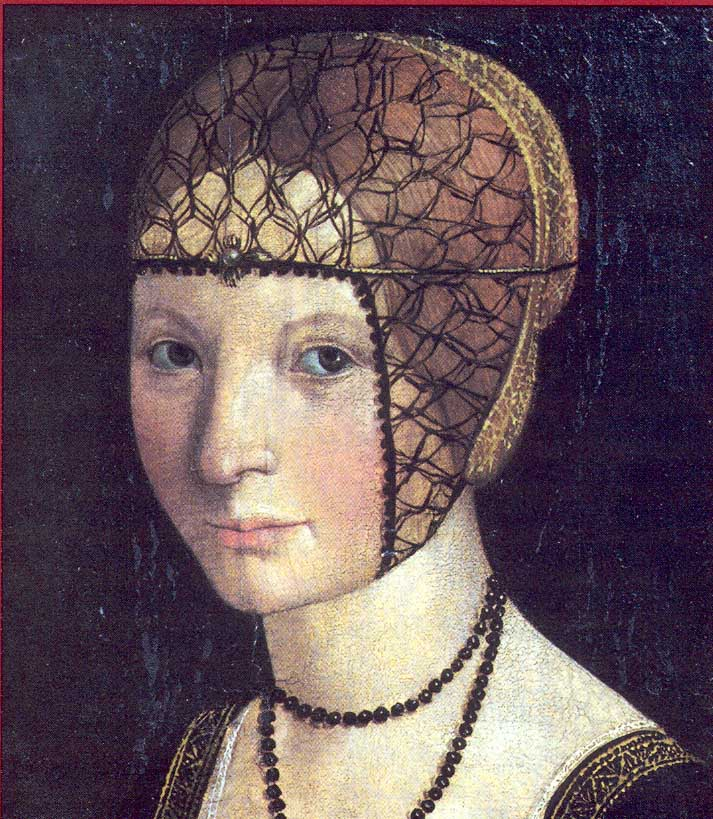
- Portrait of Anne d'Alençon by Macrino d’Alba

Marquise consort of Montferrat
- Tenure: 31 October 1508 – 4 October 1518
- Born: 30 October 1492
- Died: 18 October 1562 (aged 69); Casale Monferrato, Italy
- Spouse: William IX, Marquis of Montferrat
- Issue: Maria Paleologa; Margherita, Duchess of Mantua; Boniface IV, Marquis of Montferrat
- House: Valois-Alençon
- Father: René, Duke of Alençon
- Mother: Margaret of Lorraine

Anne d'Alençon (Italian: Anna d'Alençon) (30 October 1492 – 18 October 1562), Lady of La Guerche, was a French noblewoman and a Marquise of Montferrat as the wife of William IX, Marquis of Montferrat. She acted as Regent of the Marquisate of Montferrat for her son, Boniface from 1518 to his death in 1530.

== Life ==
Anne was the third child of René, Duke of Alençon and his second wife Margaret of Lorraine, daughter of Frederick, Count of Vaudémont and Yolande of Anjou. Her father died two days after her birth.

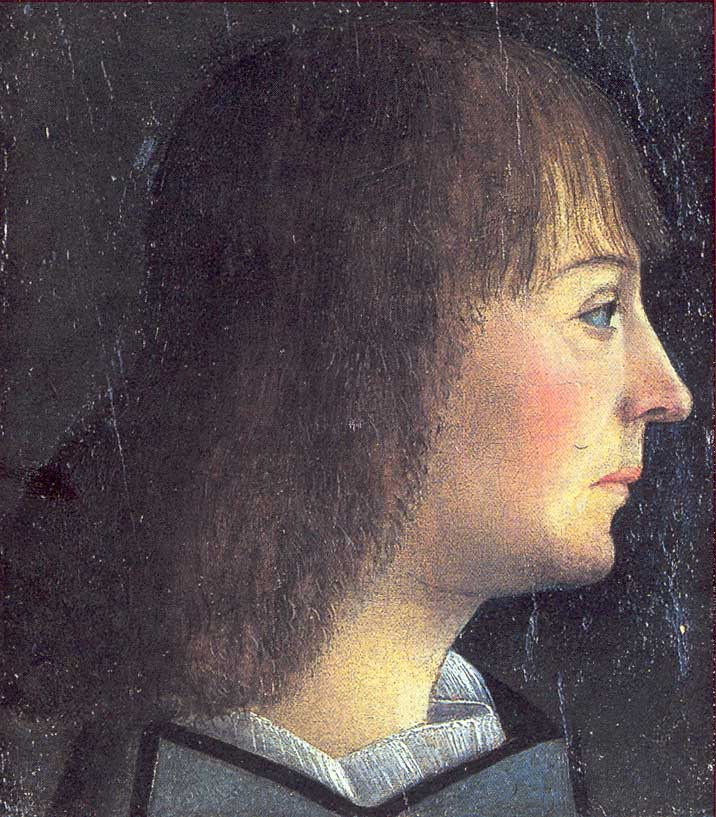
Portrait of Anne's husband, William IX of Montferrat, by Macrino d'Alba

=== Marriage ===
She was betrothed to William IX, Marquis of Montferrat of the Palaiologos family in 1501 and married him on 31 October 1508, the day after her sixteenth birthday, in the church of St. Sauveur in Blois. She bore her husband three children: Maria (1509–1530), Margherita, (1510–1566), and Boniface (1512–1530), William's heir who became Boniface IV of Montferrat.

In 1517, her eldest daughter, Maria, was betrothed to Federico II Gonzaga, son of Isabella d'Este, who later became Marquis and Duke of Mantua. The marriage contract was annulled, however, after Federico accused Maria of attempting to poison his mistress Isabella Boschetti, wife of the Count of Calvisano.

=== Regency ===
On the death of William in 1518, the infant Boniface inherited the Marquisate. Anne, however, acted as regent until his unexpected death in June 1530. She remained involved in the government of Montferrat when Boniface was succeeded as Marquis by her brother-in-law John George, previously commendatory abbot of Lucedio and (unconsecrated) Bishop of Casale.

=== Later life ===
Boniface's death also rekindled Federico II Gonzaga's interest in marrying Maria. On the latter's unexpected death in September 1530, his attentions turned to the second daughter, Margherita. Having weighed up the various proposals for Margherita's hand, Anne opted for the link with the House of Gonzaga and the marriage was concluded in October 1531.

In 1533 the Marquis John George died, leaving one natural son, but no heir. A dispute over the succession to the Marquisate, an imperial fiefdom, ensued, the contenders being the Gonzaga, the Marquis of Saluzzo and the House of Savoy, all of whom were able to make plausible claims.

Meanwhile, the Montferrat was effectively under Spanish domination. In 1536 Charles V, Holy Roman Emperor assigned the fiefdom to Margherita Paleologa and her husband, Federico II, Duke of Mantua. Anne, however, returned as de facto ruler. In 1540 Federico II died at Marmirolo and was succeeded by his seven-year-old son Francesco as Marquis of Montferrat and Duke of Mantua. Margherita Paleologo Gonzaga became regent, together with her brother-in-law Cardinal Ercole Gonzaga.

On retiring from public life Anne d'Alençon entered the convent of Dominican Sisters of Catherine of Siena which adjoined her palazzo in Casale Monferrato. She died on 18 October 1562, shortly before her seventieth birthday.

== The Alençon inheritance ==
In 1525, following the Battle of Pavia, Anne's brother Charles IV, Duke of Alençon died leaving his personal property to Anne and to her sister Françoise d'Alençon – disputed unsuccessfully by Charles's widow, Marguerite, sister of Francis I, King of France. Anne in turn assigned these assets to Isabella Gonzaga, the eldest daughter of Federico and Margherita. Isabella having renounced the inheritance, Margherita succeeded in having them transferred to her third son Ludovico, later Duke of Nevers and founder of the Gonzaga-Nevers branch of the House of Gonzaga.

== Sources ==
- Hickson, Sally Anne (2016). Women, Art and Architectural Patronage in Renaissance Mantua: Matrons, Mystics, and Monasteries. Routledge.
- Potter, David (1995). Keen, Maurice (ed.). A History of France, 1460–1560: The Emergence of a Nation State. Macmillan.
