= Boschetti =

Boschetti is an Italian surname. Notable people with the surname include:

- Americo Boschetti (1951–2025), Puerto Rican singer, composer and guitarist
- Amina Boschetti (1836–1881), Italian romantic ballet dancer
- Isabella Boschetti (16th century), Mantuan noblewoman
- Ryan Boschetti (born 1981), American football player

== See also ==
- 17056 Boschetti, a main-belt asteroid
