= Paleologa =

Paleologa is a surname. Notable people with the surname include:

- Margaret Paleologa (1364–1420), Italian noblewoman
- Margaret Paleologa (1510–1566), Italian noblewoman
- Maria Paleologa (1508–1530), Italian noblewoman
