= Marguerite de Lorraine =

Marguerite de Lorraine, Marguerite de Vaudémont or Marguerite de Lorraine-Vaudémont may refer to:

- Margaret of Lorraine (1463–1521), Blessed, Duchess of Alençon, wife of René d'Alençon
- Marguerite of Lorraine (1615–1672), Duchess of Orléans, wife of Gaston de France
