= Federico Gonzaga =

Federico Gonzaga may refer to:

- Federico I Gonzaga, Marquess of Mantua (1441–1484), Marquess of Mantua, 1478–1484
- Federico II Gonzaga, Duke of Mantua (1500–1540), ruler of the Italian city of Mantua
- Federico Gonzaga (cardinal) (1540–1565), his son, Italian Roman Catholic Cardinal and Bishop
