= Boniface of Montferrat =

Boniface of Montferrat may refer to:

- Boniface I, Marquis of Montferrat (r. 1192–1207), leader of the Fourth Crusade and king of Thessalonica from 1204
- Boniface II, Marquis of Montferrat (r. 1225–1253), also titular king of Thessalonica from 1239
- Boniface III, Marquis of Montferrat (r. 1483–1494)
- Boniface IV, Marquis of Montferrat (r. 1518–1530)
