= Charles IV, Duke of Alençon =

French prince and commander (1489–1525)

Charles
- Duke of Alençon
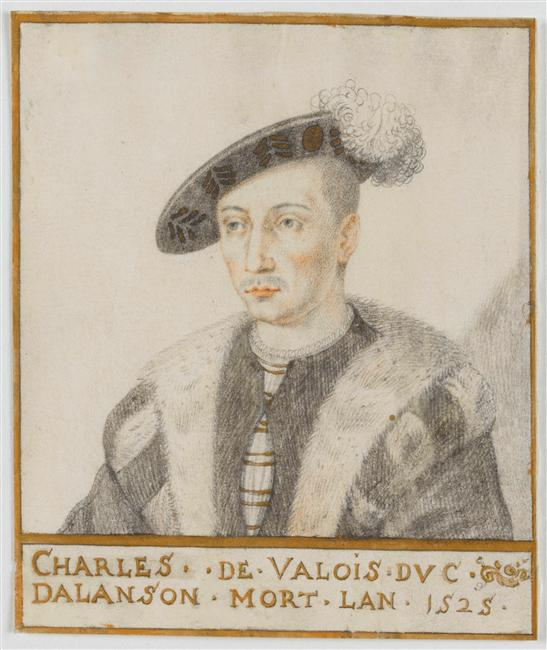
- Seventeenth-century portrait of Alençon
- Born: 1489
- Died: 11 April 1525 (aged 35–36); Lyon, Kingdom of France
- Spouse: Marguerite of Valois (1509–1525)
- House: House of Valois-Alençon
- Father: René, Duke of Alençon
- Mother: Margaret of Lorraine

Charles IV (1489 – 11 April 1525), Duke of Alençon, was a French prince of the blood (prince du sang), military commander, governor and courtier during the reigns of Louis XII and Francis I. Born into the House of Valois-Alençon, Charles (known by his title of Alençon) was a distant relation of the royal family, but one of the closest agnates. After the ascent of Francis I in 1515, he was the heir presumptive until the birth of the king's first son in 1518. He undertook his early military service in the later campaigns of Louis XII. He fought at the recapture of Genoa in 1507, and the decisive defeat of the Venetians at Agnadello in 1509. That year he was married to Marguerite, the sister of the future king Francis I. At the ascent of Francis in 1515, he saw combat as the commander of the rear-guard at the famous battle of Marignano at which the Swiss army was annihilated, restoring French control over Milan.

In the coming years he participated in various court festivities and ceremonies, most notably the famous Field of the Cloth of Gold in 1520 at which the English and French sovereigns met. He was back on campaign in 1521, participating in the defence of the Northern French frontier against attack by Emperor Charles V. After the successful defence of Mézières in September the French army took the offensive, and Alençon led the royal vanguard on the march to Valenciennes, though there would be no battle with the Imperial troops. Alençon had a role to play in the disastrous French campaign of 1524–1525. In command of the royal rear-guard, Alençon followed the royal army into Italy where Pavia was laid siege to, after several months of siege with no progress, the Imperial army was ready to give battle on 23 February, and annihilated the French army, killing or capturing much of the French nobility at the battle including the king. Alençon was the only significant commander to escape the catastrophe, retreating back to France. Ashamed and defeated, he died of pleurisy on 11 April 1525.

== Early life and family ==
Charles was born in 1489, the son of René de Valois, duc d'Alençon (Duke of Alençon) and Margaret of Lorraine. His father was a friend of the duc d'Orléans, who ascended to the French throne in 1498 as Louis XII. René died in November 1492, thereby leaving his titles to the young Charles. Charles was a prince du sang, meaning that he was agnatically — through the male line — descended from the French royal house. After 1515, the house of Valois-Alençon were the second most senior (closest relation) branch of the royal family, behind the ruling branch of Valois-Angoulême, this made Charles the premier prince du sang (first prince of the blood). Charles descended from a brother of king Philip VI.

After the death of his father, he was raised by his pious mother. Despite this devout upbringing, he would show no interest in cultural or religious innovation in his adult life. Charles' sister, Françoise entered into the Bourbon-Vendôme branch of the royal family in 1513 by her marriage to Charles, comte de Vendôme (count of Vendôme).

Charles' coat of arms

Charles controlled a ducal peerage, the duché d'Alençon or duchy of Alençon (Alençon therefore being the title by which he is known to posterity), the comté de Perche (county of Perche) and the seigneurie de Beaumont-sur-Oise. He was regularly absent from the royal court on his lands. The Valois-Alençon family had also secured the Armagnac inheritance through the marriage of Charles's grandparents Marie of Armagnac and John II of Alençon.

=== Bourbon match ===
The duc and duchesse de Bourbon, Peter II de Bourbon and Anne of France, hoped to find a worthy marriage for their daughter and heiress, Suzanne. The duc hoped to see Suzanne married to the duc d'Alençon, but the duchess disagreed and wished for their daughter to marry a Bourbon-Montpensier to strengthen the Bourbon principality. The historian David-Chapy floats the possibility that the duc de Bourbon's preference for an Alençon match might have derived from disagreement with the Bourbon-Montpensier over Suzanne's right to inherit the duché de Bourbon, but ultimately dismisses the notion, arguing that instead he may have favoured the match in return for royal concessions on approval for the inheritance.

On 21 March 1501, at Moulins, Suzanne was betrothed to the duc d'Alençon in the presence of King Louis XII and the rest of the court. For the king, a marriage between Alençon and the Bourbon was a less risky prospect than that between the house of Bourbon and the house of Bourbon-Montpensier, whose territories adjoined one another in the centre of the kingdom. The lands of Alençon were far removed from those of the Bourbon. The duchesse de Bourbon wished to see the house of Bourbon strengthened, and may have had distaste for the many rebellions of the house of Valois-Alençon against the French crown. The historian Crouzet adds, that the people of her territories had distaste for Normans (the province of Alençon being in Normandy), and a further fear that Alençon might seek to subsume her house beneath the grandeur of his own. In August 1501, her preferred candidate for the marriage, Louis II, comte de Montpensier died and her focus therefore turned to Louis's brother and successor, Charles. After the death of the duchesse's husband on 10 October 1503, Alençon and his mother Margaret travelled to Moulins, but arrived too late: the widowed duchess moved to void the engagement between Suzanne and Alençon. Two gentleman were dispatched to explain the collapse of the prospective marriage to Alençon and his mother. To avoid instigating bad blood between the Bourbons and Alençon, according to Guillaume de Marillac, it was explained to Alençon that the arrangement was annulled because it risked a conflict between the duchesse de Bourbon and her subjects, who wished to remain under the authority of a Bourbon. With the fait accompli presented to Alençon, a contract of marriage between Suzanne and the new comte of Montpensier could be established on 26 February 1505. Suzanne would marry the comte in May 1505.

=== Angoulême match ===
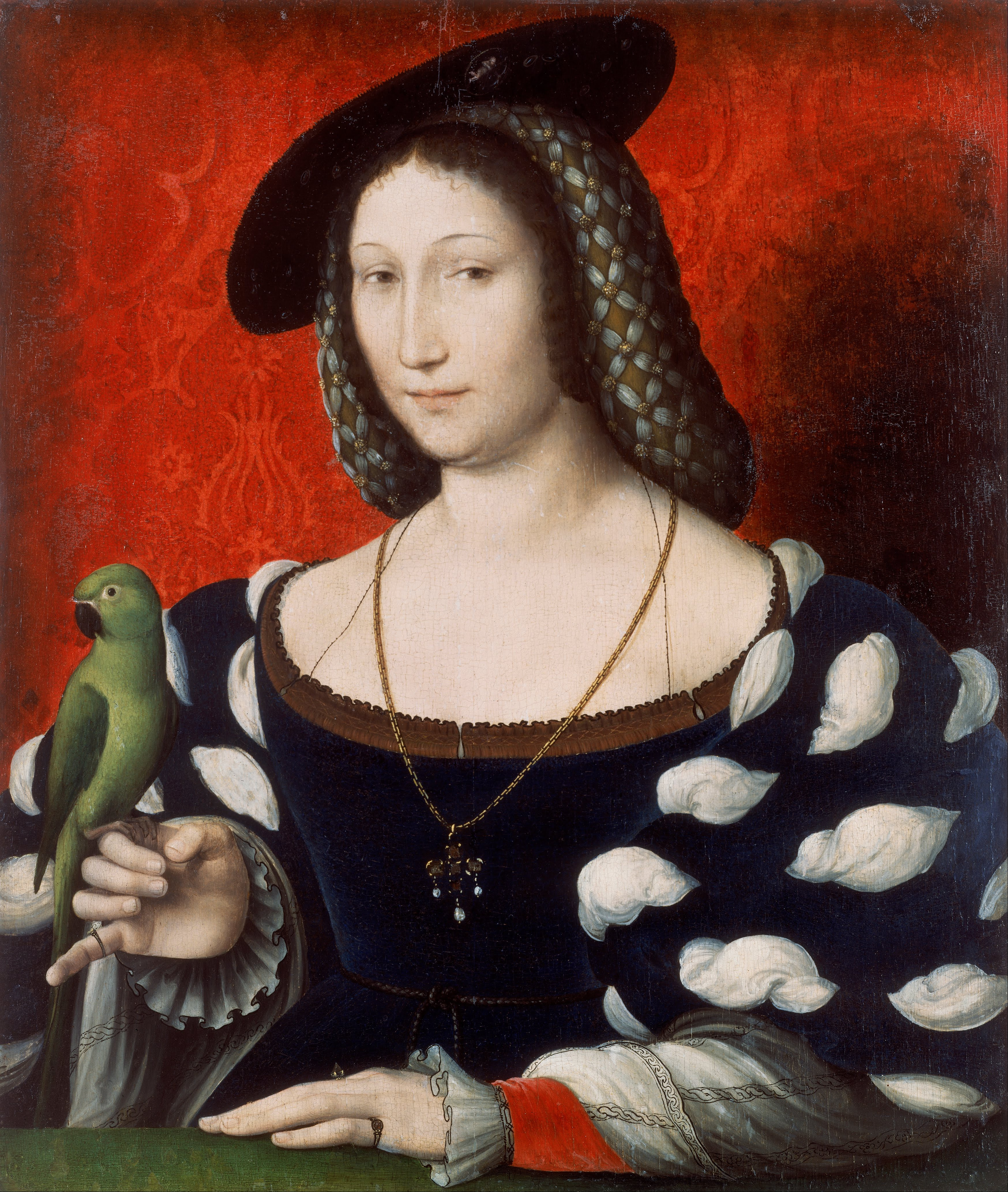
Marguerite of Valois-Angoulême, wife to Charles from 1509 to his death in 1525

With the prospect of marriage to Suzanne sunk, negotiations for a marriage with the Valois-Angoulême were opened, perhaps as early as 1507. On 9 October 1509, Charles was engaged to Marguerite de Valois, the daughter of Charles de Valois, comte d'Angoulême, and Louise of Savoy. She was three years his junior and according to the historian Knecht was "intelligent, vivacious and physically quite attractive". Her dowry was set at 60,000 livres (pounds). The two were married on 2 December of the same year. Marguerite was the sister of Francis, who was the heir presumptive to King Louis XII because the king had no son.

There was little love to be found in the marriage of Charles and Marguerite. He had no place in her correspondence, and they had no children together. Marguerite devoted herself to "pious meditation and good works" as an escape from the marriage.

=== Patronage and associates ===
The explorer of the New World Giovanni da Verrazzano (whose 1524 expedition to the North American coast received a royal commission) named many features he encountered after members of the French nobility. Alençon was among the princes to receive a topographic feature named after him, alongside the duc de Vendôme and the comte de Saint-Pol.

The attorney Jean I de Brinon|de Brinon served Alençon as his chargé d'affaires. Alençon established Brinon as the chancellor of the duché d'Alençon. Another figure, Charles Tiercelin, served as his wife Marguerite's chamberlain. La Roche du Maine played a role in Alençon's compagnie d'ordonnance (core military unit of the French military, containing the aristocratic heavy cavalry), serving first as an archer, then as the compagnies guidon, and finally as the lieutenant of the compagnie.

== Reign of Louis XII ==
=== Early feats of arms ===
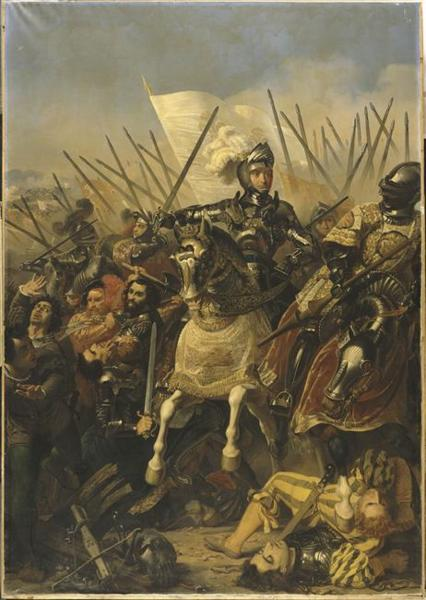
Battle of Agnadello

The French ruled city of Genoa entered rebellion in July 1506. This uprising initially had a class character, rather than an anti-French focus. The popolari (common people) succeeded in extracting concessions from the French governor of the city as to the share of authority granted the local nobility in urban government. Louis XII was unhappy about the course of events in Genoa, and planned first to levy a fine on them before resolving to launch a military expedition against the city. With the French evacuating the city, in March 1507, a council in Genoa declared themselves to be at war with France. By March 1507, the French under Louis had already arrived with an army in the Piedmont. After a short siege, Genoa was surrendered to the king and he entered the city as a triumphant conqueror on 29 April. Alençon participated in this brief campaign.

While in Italy, Louis discussed with King Ferdinand II of Aragon at Savona about the desirability of cutting the Venetians down to size. Holy Roman Emperor Maximilian I and Pope Julius II also had territorial bones to pick with the Venetians. Louis arrived in Italy again to lead a new campaign against the Venetians in 1509. On 17 April 1509, he declared war against them, though combat had already begun a few days earlier. A few weeks later, the French army crossed the river Adda and now found itself close to the Venetian army. On 14 May, while the Venetian army was strung out along the road, the French vanguard attacked the Venetian rear-guard around Agnadello. Alençon, present at Agnadello, commended himself in the fighting that followed. The battle was a decisive French victory, and as a consequence of the triumph, the Venetians would lose almost all their Terraferma (mainland Italian territories).

=== English match ===
An alliance and peace was established between England and France on 7 August 1514. As part of this arrangement, King Louis XII was engaged to marry Mary, sister of King Henry VIII of England. On 3 October 1514, Mary landed at Boulogne. A delegation of princes was there to welcome her, including the duc d'Alençon, the duc de Bourbon, the comte d'Angoulême, the sieur d'Orval and the vicomte de Thouars (viscount of Thouars). Alençon attended Mary's coronation and participated in the martial games were organised by the hôtel des Tournelles.

Having assembled an army, Louis hoped to invade Italy again in the first weeks of 1515. By this time, all the French conquests of the previous years in Italy had been lost. His invasion would not come to pass however, as he would die on 1 January 1515. He was succeeded by his son-in-law, Francis I, hitherto comte d'Angoulême. Because Francis still had no son, Alençon became the heir presumptive to the French throne.

== Reign of Francis I ==
By 1515, Alençon led one of the three remaining 'princely branches' in the kingdom (alongside the Bourbon-Vendôme and Bourbon-Montpensier), that of Valois-Orléans and Valois-Angoulême having united with the crown in the figures of Louis XII and Francis I respectively.

=== King's council ===
The royal councils of Francis I were dominated by nobles d'épée (nobles of the sword, i.e. the military nobility) however, these nobles primary came from the lower or middling nobility. Princes, such as the duc d'Alençon, King Henry II of Navarre and Charles, duc de Bourbon (who also served as the constable of France, head of the French military) constituted only a minority among this list.

By virtue of his status as a prince du sang, Alençon qualified as a 'born councillor' to the French king. Alongside the king of Navarre, the duc de Bourbon, the comte de Vendôme, cardinal de Bourbon and the comte de Saint-Pol, he was therefore sometimes called to royal council. These men's summons came more frequently than did the summons to other princes and ducs. However, neither he, nor any of the other princes with the exception of the comte de Saint-Pol were ever allowed to have any significant political heft.

At the start of Francis' reign, the king lacked much in the way of a personal faction, and therefore his council largely comprised men, such as Alençon, who had served in the royal council of Louis XII. Alençon was recorded in attendance of royal council three times in 1515, four in 1516, and once in 1517, 1518 and 1524. During 1516 he was present for the ratification of the treaty of Noyon and the concordat of Bologna. In their analysis of the composition of the royal council through the reign of Francis I, the historians Michon and Rentet ascribe to Alençon a role of secondary importance in the council for the years 1515, 1516, 1517, 1518 and 1524.

Alençon enjoyed close personal proximity in relation to the new king in part due to king's' affection for his sister, Alençon's wife. Francis was keen to shower favour on both his mother Louise and his sister Marguerite, far more so than that he offered to his most powerful vassal the duc de Bourbon. The court poet Marot described the trio as the royal trinity. This led to Alençon being the recipient of the governorships of Normandy (on 18 January), as well as that of Brittany, and of many royal gifts. Normandy was the richest province of the kingdom.

=== Out with the old ===
On 10 January 1515, the funeral procession for Louis made its way through Paris. Behind the funerary chariot walked the ducs of Alençon, Bourbon, Châtellerault, and the comte de Vendôme. The next day, the king was buried at Saint-Denis.

Six days after Louis' burial, Francis made for Reims so that he might be crowned and consecrated with the holy oil. The procession to Reims was one of grand scale, featuring many princes among whom: the duc d'Alençon of the Valois-Alençon; the duc de Bourbon of the Bourbon-Montpensier; the comte de Vendôme and the comte de Saint-Pol of the Bourbon-Vendôme; the comte de Guise of the house of Lorraine and the comte de Nevers of the house of La Marck. The various knights of the Ordre de Saint-Michel (Order of Saint-Michel - senior French order of chivalry, founded by Louis XI) were also to be found there. Alençon's wife, Marguerite, and the king's mother Louise accompanied the procession as well. The party arrived before Reims on 24 January.

An elaborate entry was put on for the host as they entered Reims. This journey through the city ended before the cathedral of Reims where the king was greeted by the archbishop of Reims. In the very early hours of 25 January, the king took his matins with those princes closest to him by blood (Alençon being the most proximate prince). The time of the matins had been shifted to around midnight due to the ceremonies of the coming day.

On the morning of 25 January, the royal party once more made for Reims cathedral. The king took a seat by the archbishop of Reims, along with the traditional twelve peers of the realm. These twelve peers were divided into two categories. Firstly the six 'ecclesiastical peers among whom there were three ducal-peers (the archbishop of Reims, the bishop of Laon - cardinal Bourbon, and the bishop of Langres) and the three comital-peers (the bishop of Châlons, the bishop of Noyon and the bishop of Beauvais). For the six lay peers, substitutes had to be used, as almost all of the titles now belonged to the royal domain. The three ducal lay peers were the duke of Burgundy, the duke of Normandy and the duc de Guyenne, all of whose titles were held by the crown, and therefore were stood in for by the duc d'Alençon, the duc de Lorraine and the duc de Châtellerault respectively. The comital lay peers were the counts of Champagne, Toulouse, and Flanders, while Flanders alone was still independently held outside of the king's royal domain, it was held by Charles of Austria, who was absent, therefore the comte de Saint-Pol, the prince of La Roche-sur-Yon and the comte de Vendôme represented these three figures for the ceremony.

Various intricate ceremonies followed, as the king gave his oath of coronation, dressed in the garb of knighthood, was anointed with the chrism, and crowned. As the stand in for the duke of Burgundy, Alençon played a role in the part of the ceremony in which the king was dressed as a knight. Having had his cloak stripped from him, the king's grand chambellan (grand chamberlain), the duc de Longueville gave Francis his breeches, Alençon then affixed spurs onto the king's ankles. No sooner affixed were they then removed. Finally the archbishop of Reims girded the king with his sword, before he was knighted by the constable, the duc de Bourbon. When all the rituals were concluded, Francis departed from the cathedral, preceded by the princes of the blood to be acclaimed by the crowd gathered behind barriers outside. On 27 January, the royal party made to return to Paris.

On the return to the capital, another series of displays greeted the royal party. Various spectacles had been erected in the streets to be seen. One of these spectacles featured a representation of the king in his regalia, with a woman on either side (lady France and lady Faith). Around this group in turn were six figures carrying lances identifiable by their heraldic symbols as including the ducs de Bourbon and Alençon and the comte de Vendôme. The scaffold finished with representations of the common people, vigilance and fidelity.

=== Marignano campaign ===
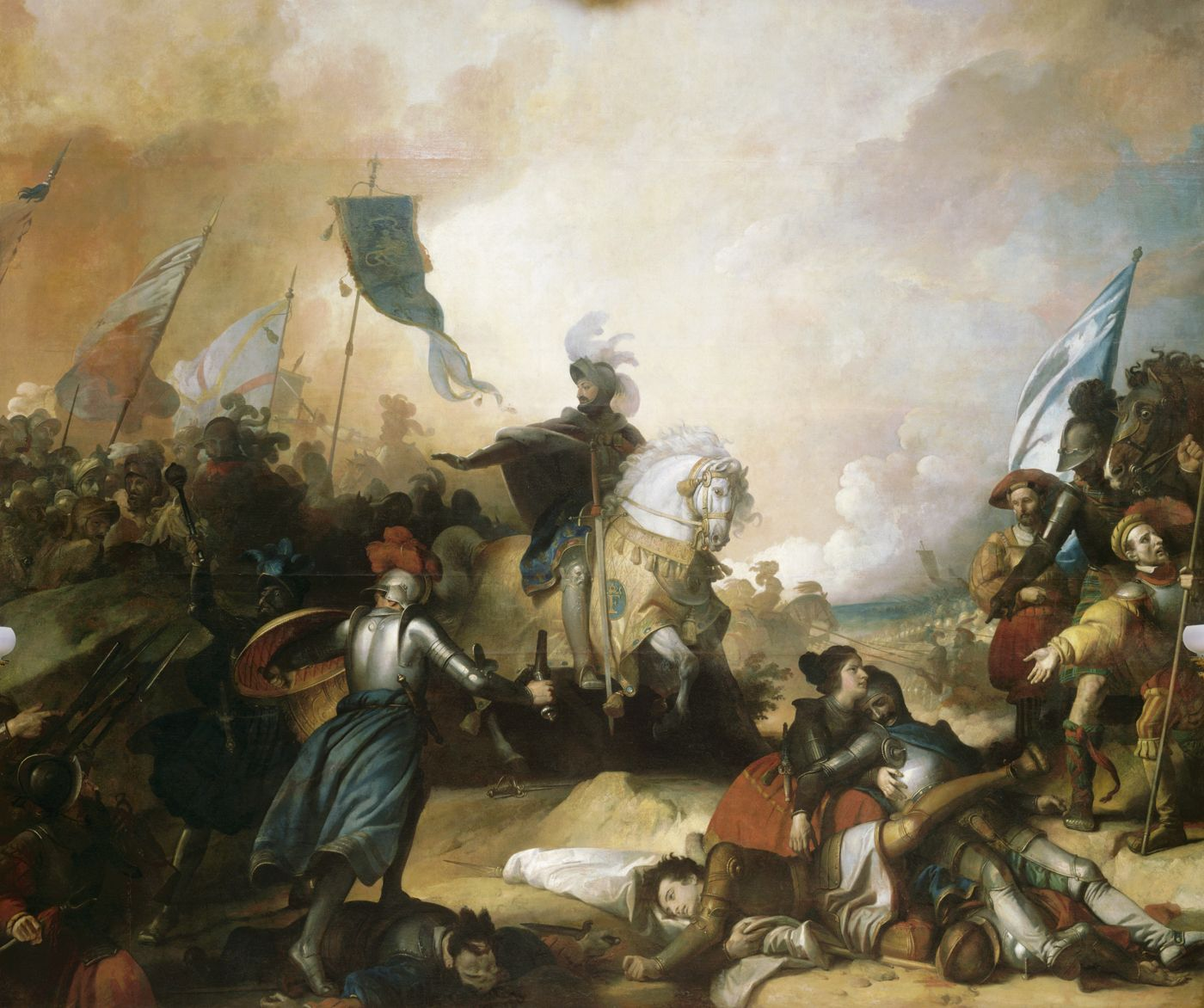
Conclusion of the battle of Marignano

Francis resolved to leave the government of the kingdom in his absence for campaign in the hands of his mother, Louise. Around July 1515, this was approved by the royal council, which contained on this occasion: the duc d'Alençon, the duc de Lorraine, the duc de Bourbon, the vicomte de Thouars and the seigneur de Boisy.

On 17 July, the constable of Bourbon, at the head of the royal vanguard, led 10,000 men on the road to Grenoble. This force was followed down the same route, four days later, by the main body of the army under the king. Alençon, in command of the rear-guard with the cavalry and baggage, marched alongside the king. By 1 August, the army was united in Grenoble.

According to the writer Guillaume de Marillac, while the French army was in Grenoble, it was learned that 40,000 Swiss had descended into Italy and were endeavouring to block the passes into the peninsula. It was also learned that the condotierri (a type of Italian contract mercenary) Prosper Colonna with several hundred men-at-arms, and several thousand Spanish soldiers intended to block the Piedmontese passes. To accomplish the penetration of the peninsula in these conditions, the false rumour that the army intended to cross via the Montgenèvre pass was disseminated. Meanwhile, the maréchal de La Palice (marshal de La Palice) led an operation that surprised Colonna and captured him. Unaware of the successful conclusion of this, on 4 August, the duc de Bourbon departed from Grenoble with the vanguard. The constable led his troops through the Argentière pass, commanding 12,000 men and 600 men-at-arms. This force was followed by the king with the main body of the French army.

The crossing of the main body of the army into Italy was a difficult one, with many horses plummeting into ravines due to the precarious nature of the route. Arriving in the plains beyond the mountains, King Francis moved quickly east while undertaking negotiations with the Swiss, which initially looked to prove successful. In return for a large subsidy and the receipt of the duché de Nemours for the dispossessed duke of Milan, the Swiss promised to vacate Milan. However, there was division among the cantons, and the cardinal Schiner sought to rally them to maintain their conquests by a speech on 13 September. After a scuffle with some French scouts outside Milan, the die was cast.

The Swiss made their exit from Milan to give battle, departing in daylight with roughly three corps of 7,000 men and 500 Milanese cavalry. Their march was a quick and quiet one; nevertheless, dust was raised by their movements. French scouts were thus able to warn the constable of Bourbon of their coming, and he apprised the king, who was taking council along with the Venetian captain d'Alviano.

The king armed himself in an instant, raised the alarm, and issued an alert to Alençon, who was commanding the royal army's rear-guard. The vanguard was under the command of the constable and was to be found near San Giuliano. According to the historian Crouzet and Le Roux, he had with him the artillery drawn up behind a trench, 950 men-at-arms, 10,000 foot soldiers, and another 10,000 landsknechts; the battle was to be found at Santa Brigida a kilometre away, where there were 9,000 more landsknechts and the cream of the gendarmerie under the command of Francis; finally, the rear-guard under Alençon's command was to be found a further three kilometres still, and contained the army's cavalry. The historian Le Fur places the rear guard under Alençon at Santa Brigida and states that with the supplementary force under the seigneur de Montpoupon, he could boast around 8,000 men. Le Roux confirms that the seigneur de Montpoupon and the seigneur d'Aubigny served as Alençon's deputies in the rear-guard but states that the force comprised landsknechts as opposed to cavalry.

Battle was joined around 4pm on 13 September, when one of the squares of Swiss pikemen crashed into the vanguard under the fire of the French artillery. The aim of the Swiss was to quickly seize the artillery, taking advantage of the terrain to neutralise the French cavalry. Having briefly taken cover from the artillery, they fell on the French. They were charged in turn by the French gendarmes under Bourbon and the maréchal de La Palice, but these nobles were thrown back by the Swiss. The Swiss then broke into the landsknechts, causing them to descend into chaos. With the afternoon wearing on, a Swiss victory appeared likely, replicating their feats of arms at Novara two years previous. Francis now charged with his men-at-arms, causing one band of Swiss to throw down their pikes and another to withdraw. He rallied several thousand of the landsknechts and three hundred men-at-arms so that a Swiss band might be prevented from approaching the French artillery. To rally the landsknechts, he supposedly offered them a sizable share of the booty awaiting with the capture of Milan. Bourbon would also succeed in driving the Swiss back. Fighting continued through the evening, becoming increasingly confused in the dark, until the moon disappeared around midnight, and the fighting had to cease.

In the lull, Francis spun off several letters, including one to the allied Venetian commander Alviano, urging him to make from Lodi with all the speed he could manage. Fighting resumed at daybreak. Francis had formed the French army back up into a line, with the constable of Bourbon commanding the right, the king in the centre, and Alençon the army's left. The French artillery offered a full showing. The Swiss, again in three bodies, focused their strongest efforts on the centre of the French line, where the king was to be found. Meanwhile, smaller units attacked the wings, which were commanded by Bourbon and Alençon respectively. According to Marillac, though Bourbon's tent was pillaged, he successfully repelled the Swiss that attacked him. Meanwhile, Alençon contained the Swiss on his wing. It was in the centre where the Swiss were able to enjoy the offensive. Francis immersed himself in the combat, receiving several pike blows. For other French gentlemen, the new advance of the Swiss was too much to stomach, and they fled towards Marignano. Things were beginning to go poorly for the French, until the Venetian cavalry arrived to cries of 'San Marco! San Marco!'. The French were revitalised by this turn, while the Swiss quickly fell into disarray. The rear-guard that Alençon commanded was grateful for their arrival, as they were freed of the 2,000 mercenaries that were harassing them. Around 2,000 of the Swiss would withdraw to Milan, while others headed back towards Switzerland. By 11 in the morning, the battle was over, and Francis retired to his lodgings to give thanks to God. Le Roux estimates the Swiss casualties as having been around 8–10,000 men, and the French casualties as being at least 6,000, with around 200 gentlemen dead. Many great French nobles had died in the combat, including the duc de Châtellerault (brother of the constable), the prince of Talmont (son of the vicomte de Thouars), and various other prominent lords.

On 11 October, Francis made his entry into the newly submitted Milan. Behind the king for this grand entrance were the duc d'Alençon, the duke of Savoy, the duc de Lorraine, the duc de Vendôme, the marquis of Montferrat, and the marquis of Saluzzo. After these grandees came the seigneur de Saint-Vallier at the head of the 120 gentlemen of the king's household.

Despite the victory, the French position in Italy remained precarious. Francis therefore endeavoured to win the favour of Pope Leo X. The two sovereigns met, forging many agreements, chief among which was the establishment of the Concordat of Bologna which rewrote the position of the French church in relation to the Papacy.

=== Games and celebrations ===
Returning to France in 1516, the king arrived in Lyon in February, where he stayed until July. On 28 May, he undertook a pilgrimage to see the Holy Shroud, which was at that time kept at Chambéry (it is now to be found in Turin). For the occasion of this pilgrimage there were many courtiers with the king. The procession was led by the duc d'Alençon and a captain of the landsknechts. Supposedly all of Lyon came out to watch the passage of the troop.

On 28 February 1518, the wife of the king, Claude, gave birth to her first son. The godmother of the child would be Alençon's wife (and aunt of the boy), Marguerite. The day of the young François' baptism was a moment of triumph for Claude. The king's mother, Louise, offered the château d'Amboise for the occasion. Alençon jointly led the procession from the queen's hôtel (urban palace) to Amboise with the duc de Bourbon. Various other princes du sang of the Bourbon-Vendôme family had a role to play in the ceremony. The occasion merited a glittering guest list, including figures such as the comte de Guise and the marquis of Mantua. Celebrations continued for weeks.

In addition to this baptism, it was also the occasion for the marriage of the duke of Urbino. As a celebration of this, jousts were held. Beyond this, a more elaborate display of combat was arranged at Amboise, with a mock battle over a constructed town, in which the duc d'Alençon led the defence with 100 horse and 400 foot soldiers, meanwhile the duc de Vendôme and the duc de Bourbon led an assault to capture the place. The faux settlement was even equipped with a moat and a gun battery. King Francis rushed in reinforcements into the model town, and the 'defenders' engaged in a sortie against their 'attackers'. The seigneur de Fleuranges wrote effusively about the combat, describing it as very much like real warfare'. Indeed, some died in the combat.

=== Field of the cloth of gold ===
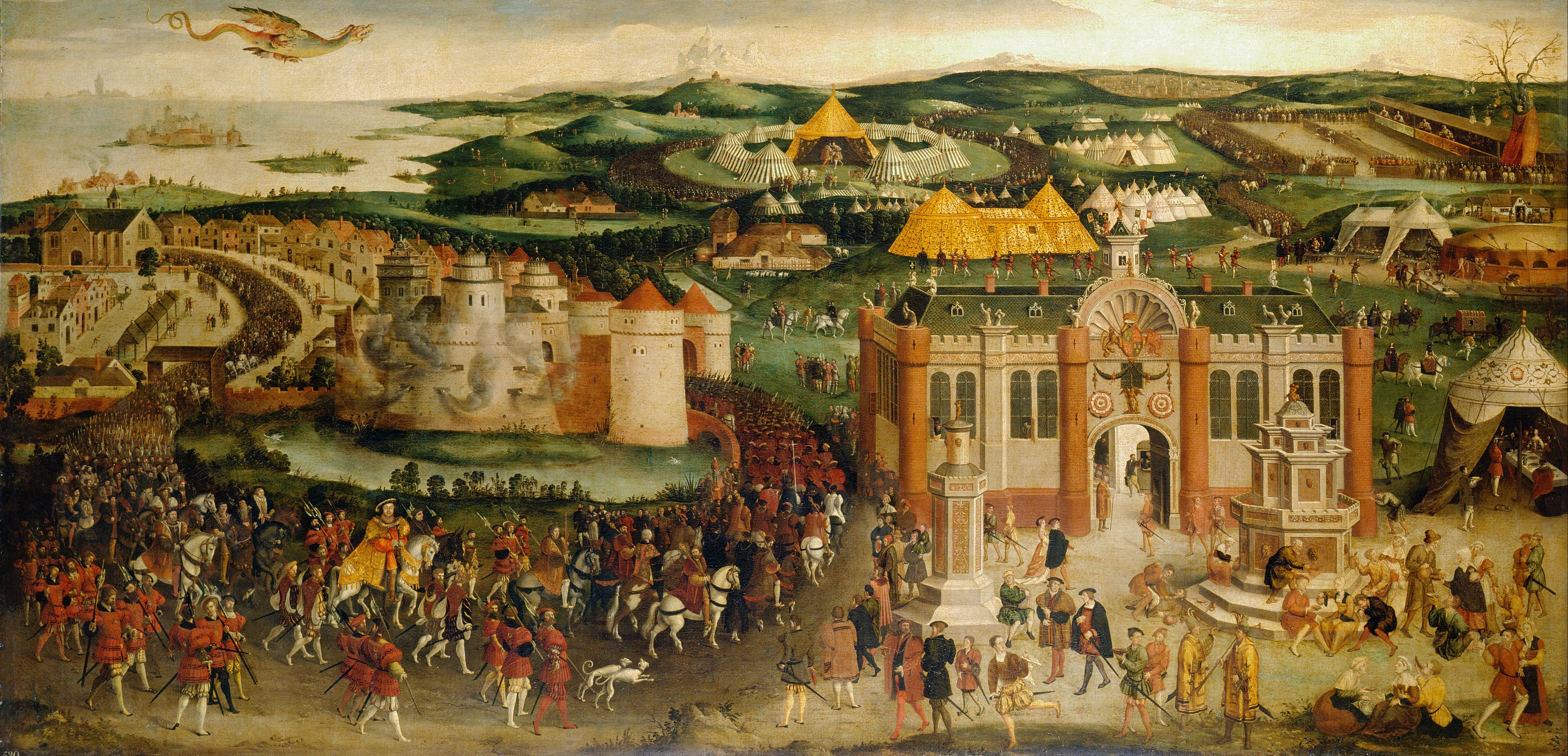
Field of the Cloth of Gold, the elaborate Pavilions are visible towards the rear of the image

In January 1520, Francis requested of cardinal Wolsey to arrange a meeting between the English and French king's, which was to be held near Guînes in north-east France. The diplomatic importance of England to France had been magnified by the merger of the Holy Roman Empire and Spanish crowns under one head, with the sovereign of England (Henry VIII) now able to play kingmaker between France and the Emperor. At the summit known as the Field of the Cloth of Gold, held in June 1520, Alençon was afforded an exclusive privilege enjoyed by few others aside than the king. Alongside the baron de Montmorency, the amiral de Bonnivet (admiral of Bonnivet, admiral being the second most senior military command behind the Constable), the comte de Tende, chancellor Duprat and the financier Semblançay he enjoyed the use of a ready made double canvass pavilion.

The two king's enjoyed a private discussion, the contents of which are unknown, on 7 June. The English cardinal Wolsey and the amiral de Bonnivet had been present alongside their respective kings, before departing to allow them to speak privately with one another.

For the occasion of this grand summit, Francis and the English king Henry engaged in Pas d'Armes (a martial game in which knights would hold a place, and those who wished to pass by it would have to fight). Those who approached the holding knights were called venans (comers), and these were led by the duc d'Alençon. A few exchanges were had but the wind was terribly fierce. The next day neither Henry nor Francis participated, and the winds were fierce enough on the Wednesday that the game was interrupted.

The winds further damaged Francis' pavilion, as well as those of many of his nobles. Alongside the feats of arms, were banquets, dances and other festivities. After the meeting broke up, the English king travelled to Gravelines where he met with the Holy Roman Emperor, and both agreed to hold a conference in Calais, and in the intervening period not to enter into separate treaties with France.

=== War in the north ===
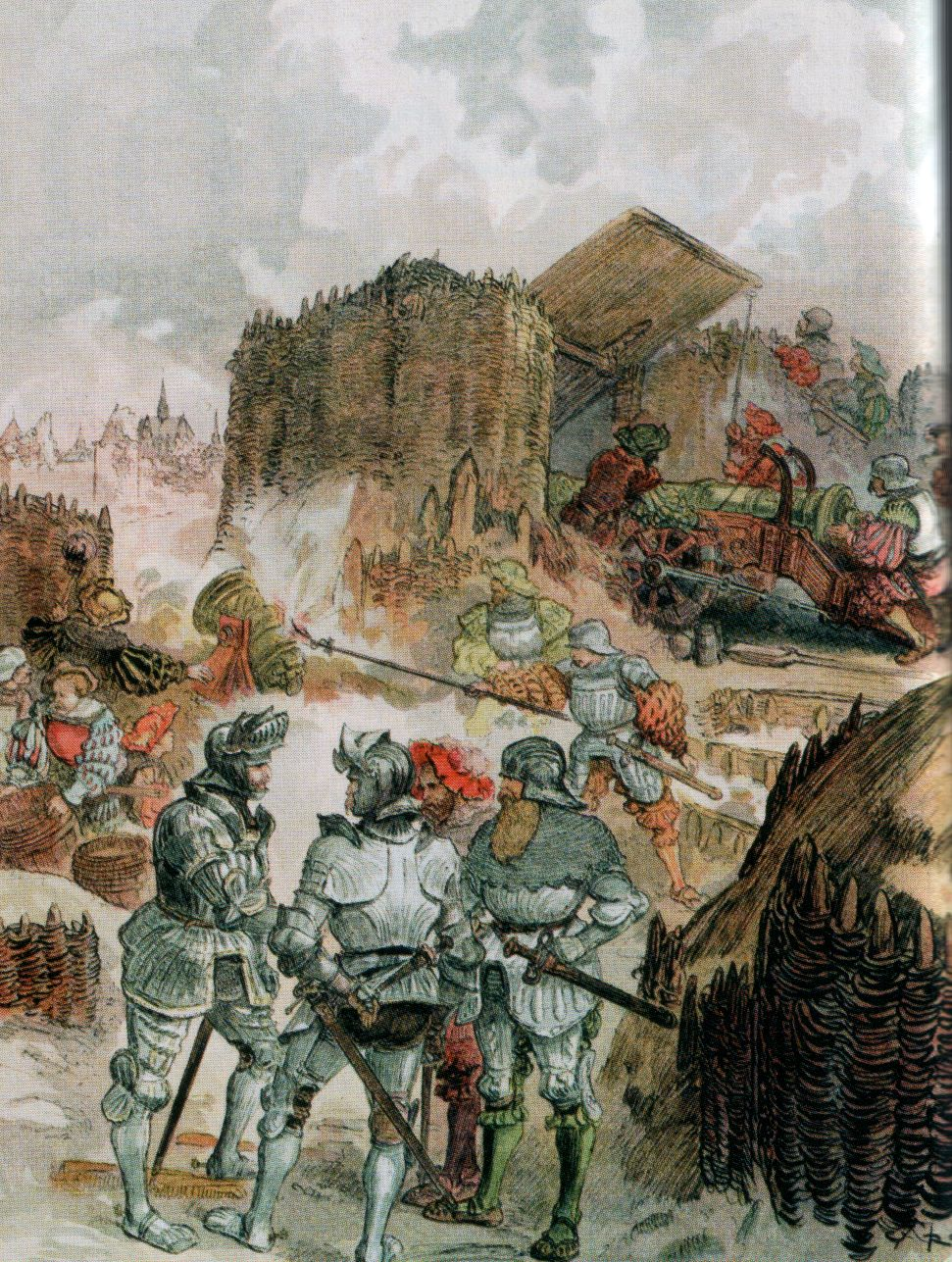
Twentieth-Century rendition of the siege of Mézières

Relevant towns in Picardie for the Franco-Imperial war in 1521
Relevant towns in Champagne for the Franco-Imperial war in 1521

In early 1521, the duc de Bouillon and the king of Navarre began local military actions against the new Holy Roman Emperor Charles V with Francis' tacit approval. Bouillon declared war on the Emperor and invaded Luxembourg, and the king of Navarre set about attempting to reconquer portions of his kingdom in the south. The Emperor lodged protests with Francis, who claimed he knew nothing of their actions, and had forbidden his subjects from aiding or abetting Bouillon. These protests carried little credibility with the Emperor. In April, Bouillon was driven from Luxembourg, and Navarre received a bruising defeat in the south. Come the summer, the invasion of northern France was threatened. On 20 August, the Emperor attacked the northern French frontier.

The royal command in the north of the kingdom was in a state of fracture and internal discord. On his own initiative the seigneur de Fleuranges (son of the duc de Bouillon) negotiated a truce with the Imperial foe, without consulting Alençon. Irritated, the prince complained to the king on 10 August that he was puzzled as to why the commander was still in contact with the enemy. Fleuranges also quarrelled with the maréchal de Coligny over the payment of soldiers. Alençon wrote to the king on 13 August, stating that the finance of the war effort was his focus, and that he would never write to the king without making a request for money. As concerned the defence of Mézières and Mouzon, Alençon informed the king on 18 August that all was being done to put the cities in a state of readiness to resist attack, but that they wished to do more, for want of funds. Indeed, the commander of Mouzon, D'Hangest had only around three to four hundred aventuriers under his command in addition to local defenders. Back on 13 August, the chevalier Bayard informed Alençon that he would take on the task of defending Mézières, and the chevalier received the endorsement of the maréchal de Coligny who wrote to the king on the matter. Two compagnies d'ordonnance (that of the duc de Lorraine, and that of the sieur d'Orval) for a total of 200 men-at-arms and 2,000 foot soldiers supplemented the cities defences. To get these soldiers to leave Reims and head to Mézières, Coligny had to take loans to cover their wages. D'Hangest would be forced to capitulate control of Mouzon.

An Imperial siege of Mézières began on 30 August under the command of the count of Nassau. Though well served in artillery, the attackers lacked the ability to undermine the walls due to the passage of the Meuse river protecting the base of them. On 27 September 1521, the beleaguered French war effort received a boost when Nassau's army was forced to lift their siege of the city. This success buoyed French morale. Francis, who had remained in the rear for the conduct of the siege, now threw himself into the fray at the head of a large royal army of 30,000 men.

This army was to set off in pursuit of Nassau, who, having put the population of Aubenton to the sword, set his soldiers on a march for Estrées. Fissures now opened in the Anglo-Imperial front. The Holy Roman Emperor continued to speak in strident terms as concerned the possibility of peace with France, claiming that the entire kingdom was truthfully his by right thanks to a Papal decision of 1303, but that the war would continue until such time as Francis had yielded Provence, Dauphiné, Burgundy, Montpellier, Asti, Milan and parts of Roussillon. Cardinal Wolsey, the English favourite was less bullish about the fortunes of pro-Habsburg English policy. He therefore looked to secure from Francis an agreement for a truce of eighteen to twenty months before the coming of November.

It was the responsibility of Alençon to organise the royal camp at Attigny. He was accompanied for this campaign by the poet Clément Marot, who outlined his experiences of the campaign in the Epistre du camp d'Atigny. On 4 October, the king conducted a review of the Swiss soldiers encamped at Attigny, marching with them pike in hand.

From his camp at Origny on 12 October, Francis expressed his openness to a truce. This truce would take a different form to the one envisioned by the English however: it would be for four to five years; not only the emperor but also Florence, Mantua, the pope and the Italian rebels would be party to it; the Emperor would have to promise not to set foot in Italy for its duration; Francis would be compensated for his deprivation of the kingdom of Naples; Navarre would be restored to its king Henri II d'Albret and the Emperor would reaffirm his commitment to marrying the French king's daughter Charlotte.

With this truce proposal going nowhere, Francis set off in pursuit of Nassau. On 19 October, the army marched on Valenciennes in battle formations. The vanguard of the army was under the command of Alençon, according to Le Fur the duc de Bourbon was with the king in the battle (the main host of the army) and the rear-guard was under the command of the duc de Vendôme. Alençon's command of the vanguard was in place of the duc de Bourbon, who had raised thousands of soldiers from his own territories for the army. According to the historian Hamon, the Constable was actually in the rear-guard, alongside the duc de Vendôme. Wherever Bourbon was, it was not in command of the vanguard, which represented an assault on the constable de Bourbon's dignity and honour, and is described by Crouzet as an intentional royal snub. Francis is supposed to have justified the giving of the vanguard to Alençon over Bourbon by his professed desire to maintain the duc de Bourbon at his side. Nevertheless embittered, the duc de Bourbon is supposed to have spread the rumour that the mediocre conclusion of the campaign was a product of the king's foolish favourites.

With word of trouble being caused in Bapaume, the king peeled off the comte de Saint-Pol, the maréchal de La Palice and the seigneur de Fleuranges to reduce (subdue) the place. They captured the town, and burned it down. The duc de Vendôme did similarly to the place of Landrecies.

Having arrived at Haspres, half way between Cambrai and Valenciennes, Francis was informed that the Emperor had come to Valenciennes. Now that the French had invaded Imperial territory he hoped to defend his lands. The possibility of battle now loomed. Having conducted a reconnaissance, Francis ordered the building of a bridge over the Scheldt to aid the armies progress. The Emperor dispatched forces to frustrate this plan, however they arrived too late, and a force under Saint-Pol was already across the river, soon to be followed by Alençon's vanguard. Francis held war council to determine how to proceed. The Constable de Bourbon, the maréchal de La Palice and the vicomte de Thouars all counselled to make battle. The maréchal de Coligny voiced his opposition to this course, and it would be this line that the king followed. He nevertheless authorised his men to pursue the retreating Imperial soldiers. That night, the Emperor withdrew from Valenciennes.

After a couple more desultory efforts by his commanders, Francis had returned to Compiègne by mid-November. The king's refusal to give battle before Valenciennes, and a few days later to Nassau was a cause of dishonour to him. In a letter to the queen mother Louise in late October from the French camp before Valenciennes, the vicomte de Thouars praised the conduct of Alençon.

=== Bourbon's treason ===
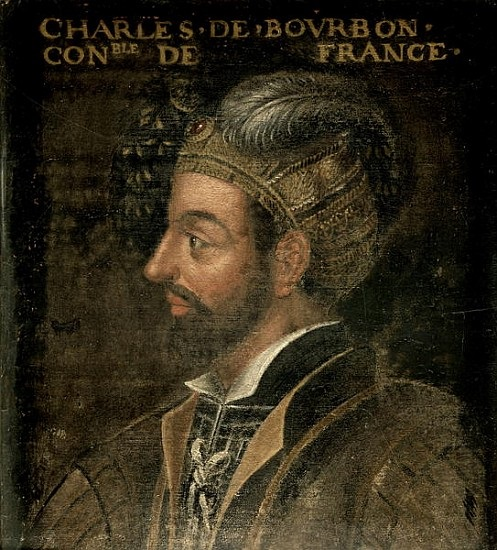
Duc de Bourbon, Constable of France who betrayed France in 1523 and went over to the Imperial camp

Back in 1521, the Constable de Bourbon's wife, Suzanne de Bourbon had died. She had willed her entire extensive inheritance go to her husband. The crown had other ideas, as the king's mother Louise was Suzanne's closest living relation (being her cousin). The case went before the parlement of Paris. The duc de Bourbon entered into contact with the Holy Roman Emperor in the summer of 1522 and let it be known that he was open to assume arms against Francis. For the moment this went nowhere, but negotiations between Bourbon and the Emperor would prove more fruitful in 1523.

From Gien, in August 1523, Francis made two announcements. Firstly, he was heading into Italy to recover the Duchy of Milan from its 'usurpers', and secondly that in his absence his mother Louise would again serve as regent. Around this time, Francis either learned of the Constable de Bourbon's intended treason or received the confirmation of it. Francis had received warning by mail from Louise who in turn had been informed by one of the conspirators. The king paid a visit to Bourbon without showing his full hand, and the Constable (who was ailing with a sickness) assured him he would join the king for his coming campaign into Italy. On 5 September, Francis ordered the arrest of several of the other conspirators (though not of Bourbon). The duc de Vendôme, cousin of Bourbon, was recalled from Picardy out of suspicions over his loyalty.

Vendôme was charged with supporting the duc d'Alençon in a campaign in the Bourbonnais and Auvergne in case of any uprising in these territories in the Constable's favour. On 7 September, the duc de Bourbon wrote letters to the king, his mother, the duchesse de Lorraine and other figures. In these he apologised for the grief he was causing but explained he was only seeking to claim what was his by right. That night he took flight, arriving in Besançon on 9 October, by December he was in Trent in Italy. Letters drawn up by the king on 11 September were read in Paris on 16 September. They urged the bonnes villes (good towns - towns that enjoyed certain royal privileges) to be resolute in their loyalty to the crown, and offered the large sum of 20,000 écus (crowns) to the party that brought Bourbon to him.

In his various letters, Francis condemned Bourbon as guilty of perjury, conspiracy and treason. On 7 March 1524, he held a lit de justice (a special session of the parlement under the presidency of the king) before the parlement. Present for the occasion were four of the twelve 'peers of France (Alençon, Vendôme, the bishops of Langres and Noyon), the chancellor Duprat, the vicomte de Thouars, and the comte de Maulévrier. The Constable was accused of rebellion, desertion and lèse majesté. He was declared to be sentenced to death, with all his property to be confiscated, thereby reverting to the control of the king. However, it would not be until July 1527, two months after the duc de Bourbon had died, that his condemnation and the loss of his property would be definitively established.

=== Italian campaign of 1523–1524 ===
The French army in Italy, under the command of the amiral de Bonnivet numbered around 30,000. The heavily outnumbered Imperials retreated into Milan, before which Bonnivet established a camp at the end of September 1523. With the army were both Alençon and the duc de Vendôme. Not wishing to assault Milan directly, Bonnivet worked to isolate the city, dispatching Bayard to capture Cremona. Bayard failed in this, but captured Caravaggio, slaughtering the garrison of the place. Disease racked the French army.

On 10 March 1524, Francis, aware of the difficulties his forces were experiencing in Italy, arranged for a procession in the capital to seek god's favour for the expedition's triumph. Participating in this procession would be the king himself and he was surrounded by the duc d'Alençon, the duc de Vendôme (both now back from Italy), the duc de Longueville, and the vicomte de Thouars. Their efforts did not find satisfaction, the situation of Bonnivet's army in Italy continued to deteriorate and the amiral was subsequently routed. What was left of the royal army departed the region with dignity, heading to Susa with their coalition partners. Francis found his authority challenged and his kingdom in danger. Bonnivet made his way to Lyon to explain his defeat to Francis, but received no reprimand, as the king prepared to resume the fight.

=== Swing of the pendulum ===
An army, under the command of the rebel duc de Bourbon made a quick advance into the French kingdom. In Provence: Vence, Antibes, Cannes, Grasse, Fréjus and Draguignan all submitted to him without firing a shot. Lorgues, Hyères and Brignoles followed. By August 1524, Bourbon found himself before the provincial capital Aix-en-Provence. On 9 August, Aix capitulated, and Bourbon declared himself the comte de Provence. His initial plan was to march north and capture Avignon then make siege to Lyon, however this proved impractical. Therefore, he advanced on Marseille, putting the city to siege on 19 August. The king, with his army was in the Papal territory of Avignon on 14 September, he wrote to those besieged in Marseille urging them to hold fast against Bourbon.

Marseille would prove a different matter to Aix and the city offered stout resistance to Bourbon. The Constable found his money running low for the continued conduct of the siege. Therefore, he was faced with the choice of either confronting the royal army, or withdrawing back into Italy. He chose the latter course, and slipped back into Piedmont with the maréchaux de Montmorency and de La Palice hot on his tail. They took many prisoners as he withdrew. Francis, who had departed from Avignon for Aix with 6,000 landsknechts resolved to follow the retreating army into Italy, leading a new campaign himself. Alongside him for this campaign were the top flight of the French nobility: the king of Navarre, the duc d'Alençon, the duc de Longueville, the duke of Albany, the maréchaux de Montmorency, de La Palice and de Foix, the amiral de Bonnivet, the grand maître de Tende, the vicomte de Thouars and the marquis of Saluzzo among various other great nobles. This concentration of the French elite was to represent a show of noble unity behind their king. Francis stayed in Aix until 6 October. Arriving in Sisteron on 8 October, he charged Bonnivet with leading the army onwards.

=== Disaster at Pavia ===
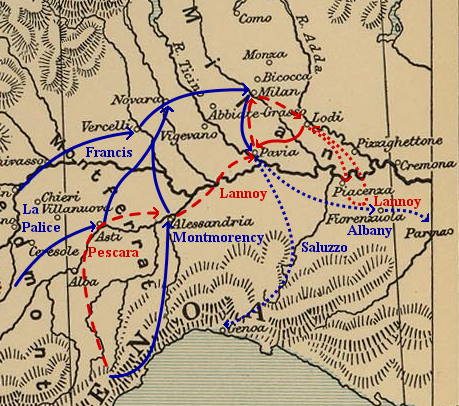
Movement of the various armies prior to the battle of Pavia

Overlay of Pavia at the time of the siege on a map of modern Pavia

On 14 October, the king was to be found in Briançon, then Pignerol from 15 to 17 October. In the absence of so much of the senior nobility, the kingdom was to be left under the regency of the king's mother Louise, with the duc de Vendôme to monitor Picardy and the Île de France, the comte de Guise and Vaudémont to keep check over Burgundy and Champagne; the comte de Maulévrier, Normandy' the comte de Laval, Brittany; and the seigneur de Lesparre charge over Languedoc.

The king arrived in Milan and now faced a dilemma on how to proceed if he wished to clear the territory of Spanish forces. Some of his captains favoured a strike at Lodi, where the duc de Bourbon and other Imperial captains were held up; others favoured a strike at Pavia. The maréchal de La Palice, and the amiral de Bonnivet favoured this latter course. Francis chose Pavia. The vicomte de Thouars was left in Milan as the king's army made to besiege the city. Having arrived at Pavia, according to Le Fur, La Palice and the armies vanguard established themselves before the castle near the river Ticino. Montmorency and much of the armies infantry made their home in the suburb of San Antonio. The armies rear-guard, under the command of the duc d'Alençon established itself in the fortified Visconti pleasure park to the north of Pavia. Le Roux diverges from Le Fur, stating that Alençon and the soldiers of the rear-guard were to be found to the west of the city around San Lanfranco. Le Roux is supported in this by Le Gall, whose book on the battle places Alençon at San Lanfranco, the royal camp in the park, and the Swiss soldiers to the east of the city outside of the park. The city itself, under the command of the Imperial captain de Levya was well garrisoned with 5,000 landsknechts, 500 arquebusiers, 300 men-at-arms and 200 light horse.

After a few days the besieging army succeeded in establishing a breach in the walls. An assault was therefore launched on 8 November. The first soldiers through the breach were mown down, and those behind them refused to follow. Though so many had died in the first assault, Francis imagined a second, though never gave the order for it. The siege was bitter, with both Montmorency, and de Levya threatening to hang prisoners that fell into their hands.

Racked by disease and defections, the French army soon lacked the strength to capture Pavia by assault. Nevertheless Francis remained confident, thinking the garrison wanted for pay and supplies, and would sooner defect than offer battle.

Keen to avoid a battle between the French and the Imperials, the Pope proposed to Francis a compromise deal by which his second son, the duc d'Orléans, would receive Milan, the dispossessed Sforza would be financially compensated and the Emperor would be assured his share of Naples. Francis, confident of victory, rejected this intervention.

Around this time, the Imperial commanders de Lannoy, Bourbon and the marquis of Pescara departed from Lodi at the head of 20,000 infantry, 7,000 men-at-arms and 500 light horse. Their first target was the French held castle of San Angelo on the road to Pavia. An assault on the castle was launched on 24 January, and proved successful. While this suggested to some of the French that a battle was imminent, the king refused to be led away to Milan, and stayed outside Pavia. He moved to the castello di Mirabello in the Visconti park, before heading to the monasteries of San Jacopo and San Paolo which were situated at the end of the park, and where Alençon and the rear-guard were to be found according to Le Fur.

Come the start of February, de Lannoy had installed himself to the north of Pavia, at the end of the Visconti park. The French besiegers of Pavia, were now themselves to be besieged. On 23 February, the movement of Imperial troops tricked the French into believing they were about to retreat. In fact, in the evening the Imperial pioneers and soldiers set to work destroying parts of the northern wall of the park.

During the night, the Imperials breached the park. According to the historian Crouzet, the French army assumed battle lines behind a trench with the king in the centre, the duc d'Alençon commanding the right and the maréchal de La Palice commanding the left. According to Michon, Alençon instead commanded the left. In the artillery duel that followed, the French artillery proved much superior to the Imperial artillery, which was poorly ranged. With the battle going well, Francis got carried away. Francis and the vanguard now charged into the Imperials, however, this impeded the French artillery from firing, thereby allowing the Imperials under de Lannoy to regroup. Francis and his cavalry advanced too far too fast, and were separated from the rest of the French army. They now came under fire from the arquebusiers of the marchese di Pescara. The Imperial forces succeeded in driving back the French landsknechts, meanwhile the forces under Alençon proved lethargic to provide support. Francis was unhorsed, and then made prisoner. Le Gall suggests that Alençon's slow provision of support or lack of support was a product of the fact that as the king had been captured, there was little point in continuing the fight. The French army collapsed, the battle having lasted little more than two hours. Alençon and his 400 lances of the rear-guard fled across a bridge over the Ticino, destroying it behind them. The destruction of the bridge meant that more French soldiers attempting to flee drowned. Michon summarises Alençon's command during the battle as short sighted and indecisive, though personally brave.

In total, Knecht puts stock in the figures of Russell for the casualties, placing those killed at around 1,200 with many more drowning in the Ticino with 10,000 made prisoner, while Imperial casualties numbered more than 1,500 total. The battle was the most significant slaughter of the French nobility since the battle of Agincourt. Among the dead on the field were to be found the amiral de Bonnivet, the maréchal de La Palice, meanwhile the maréchal de Lescun and the grand maître de Tende were fatally wounded by the combat. In addition to the dead were the vast host of prisoners, chief among which was the king himself.

Alençon survived the combat of Pavia without being made captive, the "only important French nobleman" to enjoy this privilege according to Knecht, and he retreated out of Italy back to Lyon. In his absence from France, the parlement of Paris had looked to the duc de Vendôme as the premier prince du sang. Alençon is alleged to have received a frosty reception from his wife, and Louise upon his return to France, however this is now largely a fiction. Marguerite took care of him as he fell ill and then died on 11 April. Some of the chroniclers suggested that he died of shame despite the mention of pleurisy in various sources. The idea that he died of sadness for having abandoned the field was also a contemporary suggestion. The modern historian Crouzet notes that his death was one without glory, filled with remorse for abandoning the field at Pavia. Michon meanwhile states that on his deathbed he blamed himself for Francis' defeat.

Francis himself, writing poems in his Spanish captivity, cursed those who had fled the battlefield at Pavia, among whom was Alençon.

Alençon was buried without ceremony on 1 May 1525.

During his life, the prince had been convinced by the queen mother Louise and the chancellor Duprat, to establish as his heir Francis' son the duc d'Orléans (future king Henry II), to the detriment of his own sister Françoise. This was much to the vexation of his sister's husband, the duc de Vendôme. Though the latter figure remained at court during the period of the kingdom's crisis, it was in a state of discontent for this cause among others.

Alençon was outlived by his wife, Marguerite, who during her remaining lifetime maintained the majority of the various seigneuries her late husband had held, including the duché d'Alençon. When she died in 1549, the lands were reunited with the royal domain.

The government of Normandy, vacated by his death, was granted by the king to the comte de Maulévrier upon the latter's return from Imperial captivity in March 1526. He would be invested with the charge on 6 May. Meanwhile, the government of Brittany was granted to the comte de Laval on 27 August of the same year.

== Sources ==
- Cloulas, Ivan (1985). Henri II. Fayard.
- Crouzet, Denis (2003). Charles de Bourbon: Connétable de France. Fayard.
- David-Chapy, Aubrée (2022). Anne de France: Gouverner au Féminin à la Renaissance. Passés Composés.
- Duc, Séverin (2019). La Guerre de Milan: Conquérir, Gouverner, Résister dans l'Europe de la Renaissance. Champ Vallon.
- Hamon, Philippe (2011a). "Charles de Bourbon, connétable de France (1490-1527)". In Michon, Cédric (ed.). Les Conseillers de François Ier. Presses Universitaires de Rennes.
- Hamon, Philippe (2011b). "Semblançay, Homme de Finances et de Conseil (v. 1455–1527)". In Michon, Cédric (ed.). Les Conseillers de François Ier. Presses Universitaires de Rennes.
- Harding, Robert (1978). Anatomy of a Power Elite: the Provincial Governors in Early Modern France. Yale University Press.
- Jouanna, Arlette (2021). La France du XVIe Siècle 1483-1598. Presses Universitaires de France.
- Knecht, Robert (1994). Renaissance Warrior and Patron: The Reign of Francis I. Cambridge University Press.
- Knecht, Robert (1996). The Rise and Fall of Renaissance France. Fontana Press.
- Knecht, Robert (2004). "Marignan: François Ier «vainquer des Suisses»". In Arminjon, Catherine; Lavalle, Denis; Chatenet, Monique; Anthenaise, Claude d' (eds.). De L'Italie à Chambord: François Ier et la Chevauchée des Princes Français.
- Knecht, Robert (2008). The French Renaissance Court. Yale University Press.
- Le Fur, Didier (2018). François Ier. Perrin.
- Le Gall, Jean-Marie (2015). L'Honneur Perdu de François Ier: Pavie, 1525. Bibliothèque Historique Payot.
- Le Roux, Nicolas (2015). Le Crépuscule de la Chevalerie: Noblesse et Guerre au Siècle de la Renaissance. Champ Vallon.
- Mallett, Michael; Shaw, Christine (2019). The Italian Wars 1494-1559: War, State and Society in Early Modern Europe. Routledge.
- Michon, Cédric (2011a). "Conseils et Conseillers sous François Ier". In Michon, Cédric (ed.). Les Conseillers de François Ier. Presses Universitaires de Rennes.
- Michon, Cédric (2011b). "Charles, duc d'Alençon (1489-1525)". In Michon, Cédric (ed.). Les Conseillers de François Ier. Presses Universitaires de Rennes.
- Michon, Cédric (2011c). "Odet de Foix, vicomte de Lautrec (v. 1483-1528)". In Michon, Cédric (ed.). Les Conseillers de François Ier. Presses Universitaires de Rennes.
- Michon, Cédric (2011d). "Les Frères de Bourbon-Vendôme: Charles, duc de Bourbon-Vendôme (1489-1537); François, comte de Saint-Pol (1491-1545); Louis cardinal de Bourbon (1493-1557)". In Michon, Cédric (ed.). Les Conseillers de François Ier. Presses Universitaires de Rennes.
- Michon, Cédric (2018). François Ier: Un Roi Entre Deux Mondes. Belin.
- Potter, David (1993). War and Government in the French Provinces: Picardy 1470-1560. Cambridge University Press.
- Potter, David (1995). A History of France 1460-1560: The Emergence of a Nation State. Macmillan.
- Quilliet, Bernard (1986). Louis XII: Père du Peuple. Fayard.
- Quilliet, Bernard (1998). La France du Beau XVIe Siècle. Fayard.
- Reid, Jonathan (2011). "Marguerite de Navarre, la sœur fidèle (1492–1549)". In Michon, Cédric (ed.). Les Conseillers de François Ier. Presses Universitaires de Rennes.
- Rentet, Thierry (2011a). "Jean Brinon (1484-1528)". In Michon, Cédric (ed.). Les Conseillers de François Ier. Presses Universitaires de Rennes.
- Rentet, Thierry (2011b). "Anne de Montmorency (1493-1567): Le Conseiller Médiocre". In Michon, Cédric (ed.). Les Conseillers de François Ier. Presses Universitaires de Rennes.
- Rentet, Thierry; Michon, Cédric (2011). "Annexe I: Présences annuelles au Conseil (1515-1547)". In Michon, Cédric (ed.). Les Conseillers de François Ier. Presses Universitaires de Rennes.
- Vissière, Laurent (2000). Louis II de La Trémoille ou la Découverte de L'Italie (1480-1525). École Nationale des Chartes.

French nobility
Preceded by René	Duke of Alençon; 1492–1525	Succeeded by Marguerite
Preceded by René	Count of Perche; 1492–1525	Succeeded by Marguerite
