= Francesco Gonzaga (1538–1566) =

Italian nobleman

His Eminence Francesco Gonzaga
- Bishop of Mantua; Duke of Ariano
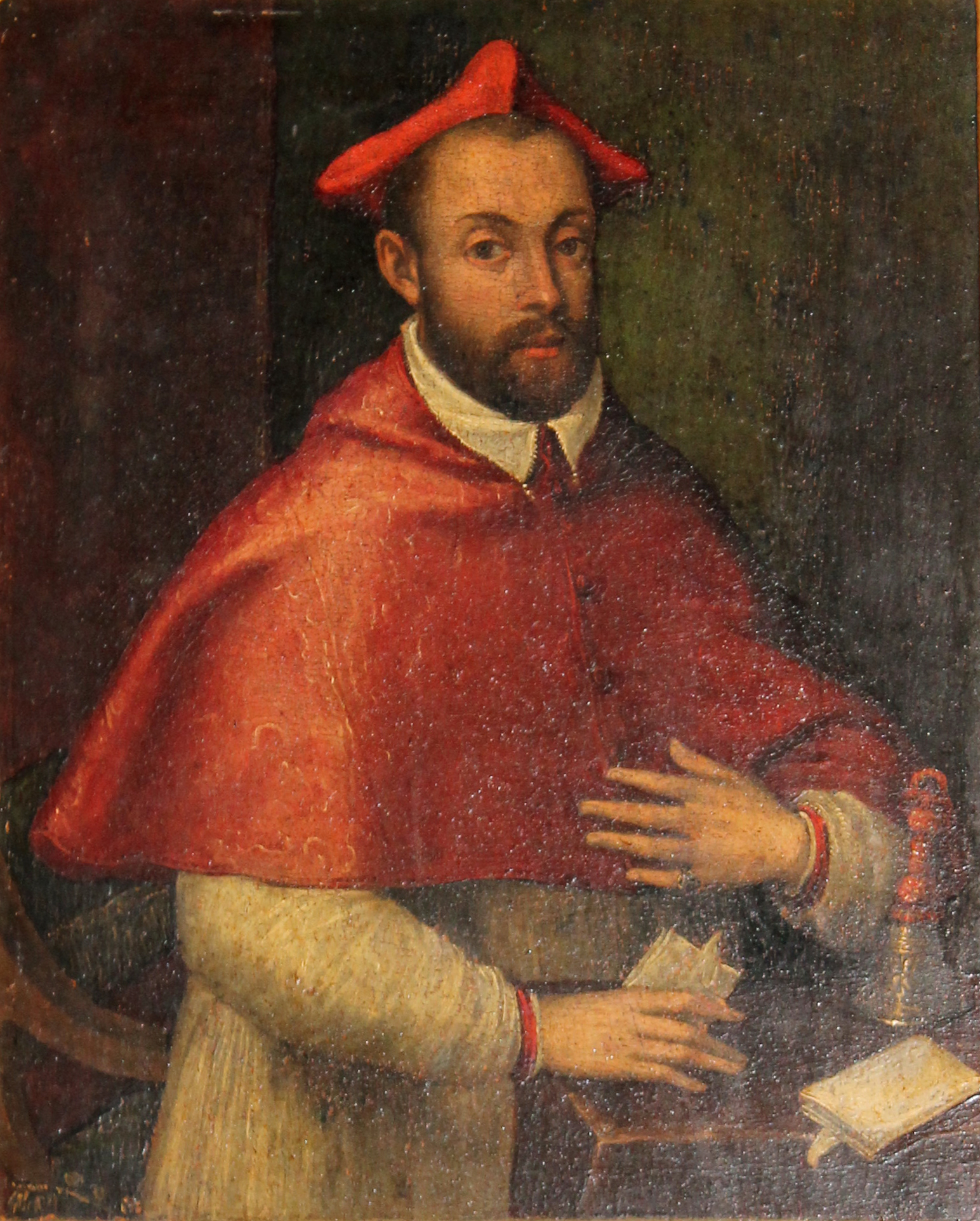
- Portrait by Fermo Guisoni, 16th century
- Church: Catholic Church
- Diocese: Mantua
- Appointed: 15 May 1565
- Term ended: 6 January 1566
- Predecessor: Federico Gonzaga
- Successor: Gregorio Boldrini
- Other posts: Cardinal-Priest of San Lorenzo in Lucina (1562-1566)
- Previous posts: See list: Cardinal-Deacon of San Nicola in Carcere (1561–1562); Archbishop of Cosenza (1562-1565)

Orders
- Created cardinal: 26 February 1561 by Pope Pius IV
- Rank: Cardinal-Priest

Personal details
- Born: 6 December 1538 Palermo, Italy
- Died: 6 January 1566 (aged 27) Rome, Papal States
- Buried: San Lorenzo in Lucina
- Coat of arms

Francesco Gonzaga (6 December 1538 – 6 January 1566) was an Italian nobleman, who was Duke of Ariano. He was also a Roman Catholic cardinal and bishop.

== Early life ==
Francesco Gonzaga was born in Palermo on 6 December 1538, the son of Ferrante Gonzaga (a member of the House of Gonzaga) and Isabella di Capua. His father was at that time viceroy of Palermo. He was the nephew of Federico II Gonzaga, Duke of Mantua. His brother Giovanni Vincenzo Gonzaga also became a cardinal.

When Ferrante died in 1557 Ercole Gonzaga became guardian and the young Mantuan humanist and future Jesuit Antonio Possevino became tutor to the brothers. Francesco studied law at the University of Padua. He began an ecclesiastical career under the guidance of his uncle, Cardinal Ercole Gonzaga. In 1538, he was made archpriest of Guastalla. On 26 February 1560 he became a protonotary apostolic.

== Clerical career ==
In March 1560, Francesco's older brother Cesare I Gonzaga married Camilla Borromeo, sister to Cardinal Charles Borromeo, and niece of Pope Pius IV. In the consistory of 26 February 1561 Pius IV made Francesco a cardinal deacon. He received the red hat and the deaconry of San Nicola in Carcere on 10 March 1561. The pope named him papal legate in the Campagne and Maritime Province.

Francesco resided for a time at the papal court, keeping his uncle Cardinal Ercole, who retired to his native Mantua, informed on the affairs of the Curia, the intrigues and factional struggles that took place there, and on the relations of Pius IV with his Borromeo relatives and with the princes. Cardinal Ercole was an influential participant in the Council of Trent. Francesco's letters, almost always inspired by Cardinal Borromeo and revised and corrected by him, constituted an indirect means often used by the pope to communicate his decisions to Ercole Gonzaga. In turn, the cardinal supplied his nephew, first from Mantua, then from Trento - where he had gone on 16 April 1561 to preside over the college of legates of the council -, suggestions, and advice and information.

On 2 March 1562 he was elected Archbishop of Cosenza with dispensation for not having reached the canonical age; he was named administrator of the see. He never set foot there, preferring to govern it through a vicar. He was a member of Borromeo's literary Academy of the Vatican Knights which met at the Casina Pio IV. His brother Cesare was also a member.

On 16 July 1562 he opted for San Lorenzo in Lucina, a titular church declared to be a deaconry pro illa vice. He opted for the order of cardinal priests on 1 March 1564 and San Lorenzo in Lucina was returned to its status as a titular church at that time. He resigned the government of the Archdiocese of Cosenza sometime before 12 January 1565. On 5 May 1565 he succeeded his cousin Federico Gonzaga (cardinal) as Bishop of Mantua with dispensation for not having reached the canonical age.

== Death ==
He arrived ill at the papal conclave of 1565-66 that elected Pope Pius V and died during the conclave, in Rome, on 6 January 1566 at the age of twenty-eight. He was buried in the choir of San Lorenzo in Lucina. The following month his brother Cesare, count of Guastalla, held an ornate commemoration in the Cattedrale di San Pietro apostolo in Mantua, including a large catafalque with an Egyptian motif.

== Sources ==
- Losito, Maria (2005). La Casina Pio IV in Vaticano. Vatican City: Pontificia Accademia delle Scienze.
