= Maria Paleologa =

Italian noblewoman (1508–1530)

- Born: 19 September 1508; Casale
- Died: 15 September 1530 (aged 21); Casale
- Parents: William IX of Montferrat (father); Anne of Alençon (mother)

Maria Paleologa (19 September 1508 – 15 September 1530) was an Italian noblewoman, member of the House of Palaeologus-Montferrat, a cadet branch of the Palaiologos dynasty which had once ruled the Byzantine Empire.

== Biography ==
She was born and died in Casale, and was the eldest child of William IX, Marquess of Montferrat, and Anna d'Alençon. In 1517, when Maria was 8, her mother betrothed her to Federico II Gonzaga, son of Isabella d'Este, who later became Marquis and Duke of Mantua. The marriage contract was annulled, however, after Federico accused Maria of attempting to poison his mistress Isabella Boschetti, wife of the Count of Calvisano.

== Ancestry ==
Ancestors of Maria Paleologa

16. Theodore II, Marquess of Montferrat
8. John Jacob, Marquess of Montferrat
17. Joanna Montbéliard of Bar
4. Boniface III, Marquess of Montferrat
18. Amadeus VII, Count of Savoy
9. Joan of Savoy
19. Bonne of Valois-Berry
2. William IX, Marquess of Montferrat
20. Đurađ Branković
10. Stefan III Brankovic, despot of Serbia
21. Irene Kantakouzene
5. Maria of Serbia
22. Gjergj Arianiti
11. Angelina Arianiti
23. Maria Muzaka
1. Maria Palaiologa of Montferrat
24. Jean I of Valois, duke of Alençon
12. Jean II of Valois, duke of Alençon
25. Marie Dreux-Montfort of Brittany
6. René of Valois, duke of Alençon
26. John IV, Count of Armagnac
13. Marie of Armagnac
27. Isabella of Evreux
3. Anna of Valois-Alençon
28. Antoine of Lorraine, count of Vaudémont
14. Frederick II of Lorraine, count of Vaudemont
29. Marie, Countess of Harcourt
7. Margaret of Lorraine
30. René of Valois-Anjou, duke of Bar
15. Yolande of Valois-Anjou
31. Isabella of Châtenois
