= Amina Boschetti =

Italian ballet dancer (1836–1881)

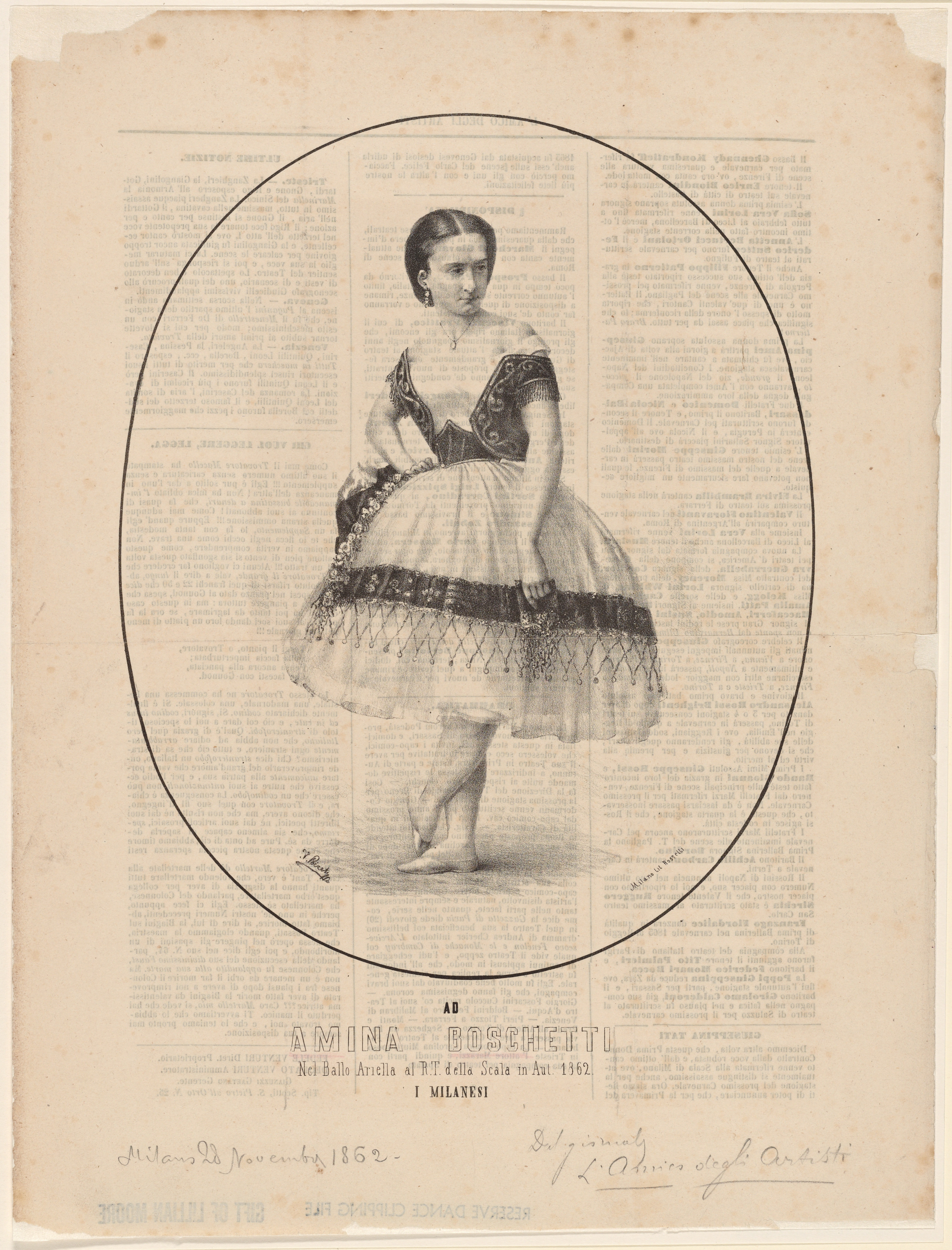
- Born: 1836; Milan, Italy
- Died: 2 January 1881 (aged 44–45); Portici, Italy
- Occupation: Ballet dancer

Giacomina "Amina" Boschetti (1836 – 2 January 1881) was an Italian romantic ballet dancer.

== Life and career ==
The daughter of an Austrian army officer, while still a child Boschetti danced in some productions with Marie Taglioni and Fanny Cerrito. Her parents enrolled her in the ballet school directed by Carlo Blasis, and she made her debut as prima ballerina in 1848, when she was only 12 years old, at the Teatro Re.

In 1849 Boschetti signed a two-year contract with the impresario Domenico Ronzani, and with his company she toured Europe, performing in Barcelona, Trieste, Florence, and Vienna, among other places. In 1852 she made her debut at La Scala, and in 1856 she was engaged at His Majesty's Theatre in London, where she spent several seasons. In 1864 she was prima ballerina at the Paris Opera for a few months, and later had great success at the Théâtre de la Monnaie in Brussels and at the Teatro Argentina in Rome.

After a temporary retirement at the end of the decade, in the last five years of her life Boschetti returned to perform, always with huge success, at the Teatro San Carlo in Naples, the Teatro Carlo Felice in Genoa, and the Teatro Apollo in Rome. She died of the consequences of a heart attack at her villa in Portici in 1881.

Charles Baudelaire dedicated a sonnet to Boschetti, "Sur les débuts d'Amina Boschetti au théâtre de la Monnaie, à Bruxelles", later included in the collection Les Fleurs du mal. She was a longtime lover of Prince Louis, Count of Trani, brother of King Ferdinand II of the Two Sicilies.
