= Francesco III Gonzaga =

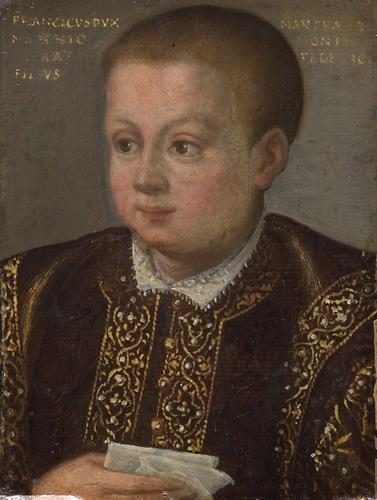

Duke of Mantua Marquess of Montferrat
- Reign: 28 June 1540 – 21 February 1550
- Predecessor: Federico II Gonzaga
- Successor: Guglielmo I Gonzaga
- Born: 10 March 1533; Mantua, Duchy of Mantua
- Died: 22 February 1550 (aged 16); Mantua, Duchy of Mantua
- Spouse: Catherine of Austria (m. 1549–50; his death)
- House: House of Gonzaga
- Father: Federico II Gonzaga
- Mother: Margaret Paleologina

Francesco III Gonzaga (10 March 1533 – 22 February 1550) was Duke of Mantua and Marquess of Montferrat from 1540 until his death. He was the eldest son of Federico II Gonzaga, Duke of Mantua and his wife Margaret Paleologina.

== Life ==
On 22 October 1549, he married Catherine of Austria, a daughter of Holy Roman Emperor Ferdinand I. The marriage lasted only four months, as Francesco died of pneumonia on 21 February 1550, after falling into one of Mantua's lakes during a hunt. The widowed Catherine returned home to Innsbruck. The Habsburgs claimed that the marriage was not consummated to increase Catherine's chances for a better second marriage.

== Honours ==
- Knight of the Order of the Golden Fleece

== Sources ==
- Parrott, David (1997). "The Mantuan Succession, 1627–31: A Sovereignty Dispute in Early Modern Europe". The English Historical Review. CXII, Issue 445, February (445). Oxford Academic: 20–65. doi:10.1093/ehr/CXII.445.20.

Regnal titles
Preceded by Federico II	Duke of Mantua; Marquess of Montferrat; 1540–1550	Succeeded by Guglielmo
