= Isabella Boschetti =

Mantuan noblewoman

Isabella Boschetti or Boschetto (c.1502 – ?) was a Mantuan noblewoman and lover of Federico II Gonzaga, Duke of Mantua. She was nicknamed 'La bella Boschetta' (the beautiful Boschetta).

== Life ==
She was the second daughter of Giacomo Boschetti, a courtier and soldier in the Gonzaga court who fought at Fornovo. Her mother was a sister of Baldassarre Castiglione. A few years after she became Federico's mistress she married a nobleman at his court, Francesco Cauzzi Gonzaga, conte di Calvisano, who suffered a violent death in mysterious circumstances. In 1542 she remarried to count Filippo Tornielli.

In 1517 Anna d'Alençon managed to get a betrothal between Federico and her eldest daughter Maria Paleologa, but this was broken off when she was accused of trying to poison Isabella. Federico built the Palazzo Te for Isabella from 1525 onwards, where she entertained and received famous guests. The couple had two children, Alessandro (1520–1580), who became State Councillor of the Duchy of Mantua and served in the Spanish army in Flanders during the Dutch Revolt, and Emilia (1517–1573) who married Carlo Gonzaga (1523–1555) signore di Gazzuolo, with whom she had ten children.

In 1531 Federico commissioned Correggio's Danaë, apparently intended for the Sala di Ovidio di Palazzo Te, intended for Isabella. Her year of death is unknown.
