= Frances of Alençon =

French noblewoman (1490–1550)

Frances
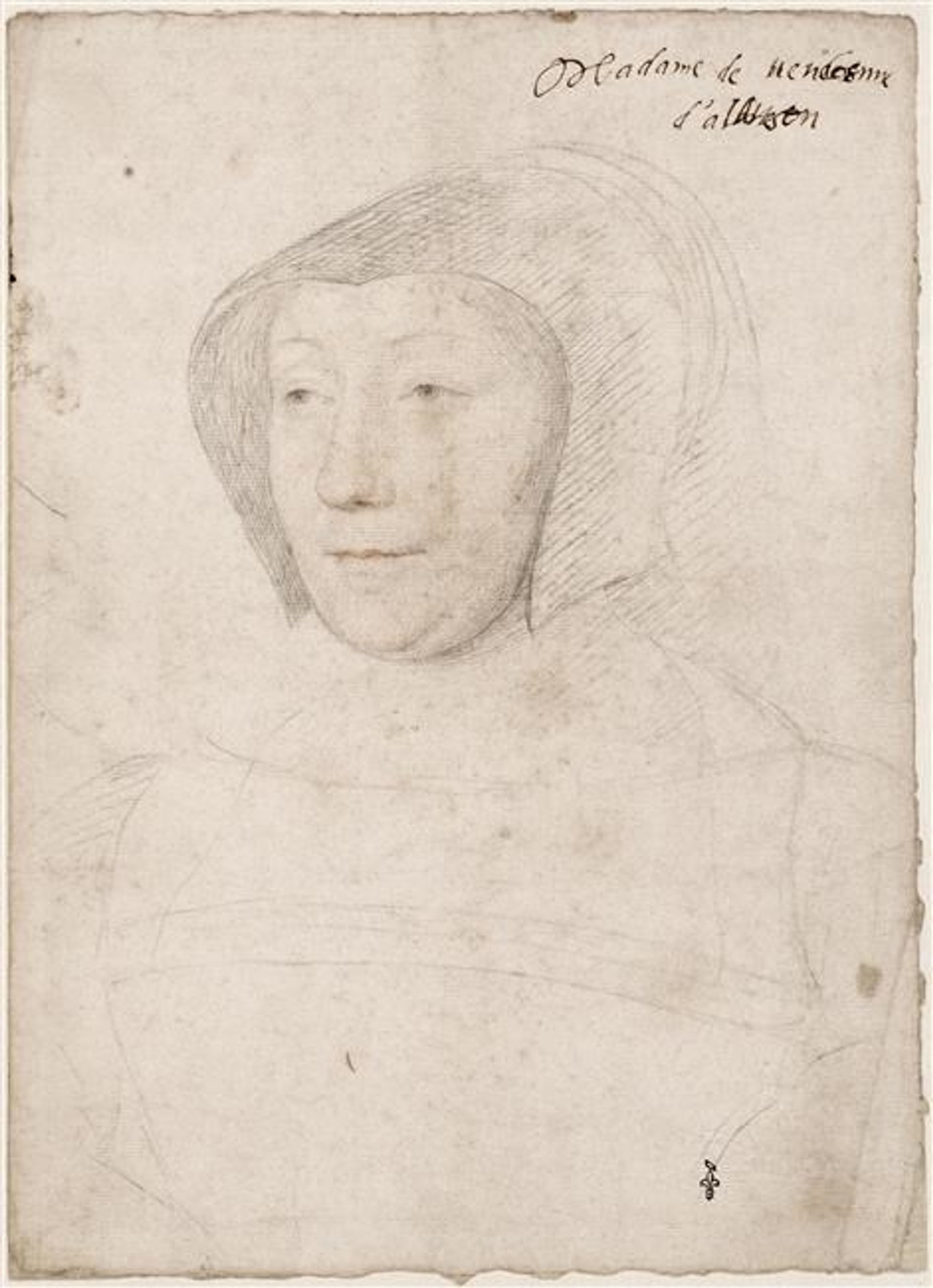
- Born: 1490
- Died: 14 September 1550 (aged 59–60); La Flèche
- Noble family: House of Valois
- Spouses: Francis II, Duke of Longueville; Charles de Bourbon, Duke of Vendôme
- Issue: see list
- Father: René of Alençon
- Mother: Margaret of Lorraine

Frances of Alençon (1490 – 14 September 1550) was the eldest daughter of René of Alençon and Margaret of Lorraine, and the younger sister and despoiled heiress of Charles IV, Duke of Alençon.

The sister and heiress of Charles IV of Alençon, she was despoiled of her heritage by her sister-in-law Margaret of Angoulême, sister of King Francis I of France.

Her son Anthony, however, went on to marry Joan III of Navarre, born of the second marriage of Margaret with Henry II of Navarre. The grandson of Françoise and Marguerite, Henry of Bourbon, would become King of France and Navarre.

== Family ==
In 1505, Françoise married Francis II, Duke of Longueville. They had 2 children:

- Renée d'Orléans-Longueville, Countess of Dunois (1508–1515), died in infancy
- Jacques d'Orléans-Longueville (1511–1512), died in infancy

On 18 May 1513, Françoise married, secondly, Charles de Bourbon, Duke of Vendôme. They had 13 children:

- Louis de Bourbon (1514–1516), died in infancy
- Marie de Bourbon (1515–1538), unmarried, prospective bride of King James V of Scotland in 1536
- Marguerite de Bourbon (1516–1559), married 1538 Francis I of Cleves, Duke de Nevers (1516–1561)
- Antoine de Bourbon, Duke of Vendôme (1518–1562), married 1548 Jeanne III, Queen of Navarre.
- François de Bourbon, Count of Enghien (1519–1546), unmarried
- Madeleine de Bourbon, Abbess of Sainte Croix de Poitiers (1521–1561)
- Louis de Bourbon (1522–1525), died in infancy
- Charles de Bourbon, Archbishop of Rouen (1523–1590)
- Catherine de Bourbon, Abbess of Soissons (1525–1594)
- Renée de Bourbon, Abbess of Chelles (1527–1583)
- Jean de Bourbon, Count of Soissons and Enghien (1528–1557), married 1557 his first cousin Marie, Duchess of Estouteville (1539–1601)
- Louis de Bourbon, Prince of Condé (7 May 1530 – 13 March 1569), married 1551 Eléonore de Roye and 1565 Françoise d'Orléans-Longueville
- Léonore de Bourbon, Abbess of Fontevraud (1532–1611)

== Sources ==
- Commire, Anne (2000). Women in World History. Vol. 10. Gale.
- Potter, David (1995). Keen, Maurice (ed.). A History of France, 1460–1560: The Emergence of a Nation State. Macmillan.
