= Siege of Mézières =

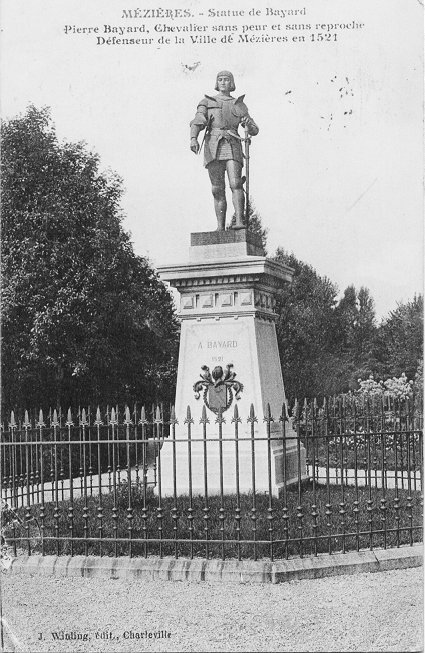
Bayard's statue at Mézières

The siege of Mézières took place in 1521, during the Italian War of 1521–1526. The town (now part of Charleville-Mézières) was besieged by an army of the Holy Roman Empire. Mézières was defended by French troops under the command of Pierre Terrail, seigneur de Bayard and Anne de Montmorency.

The siege was a failure, and the determined resistance of the French gave more time for Francis I of France to gather strength against Charles V.

== Background ==
The French offensive in Spanish territory in the summer of 1521 ended in failure; the uprising of the Kingdom of Navarre, that passed under Hispanic control in 1512, forced Marshal de Foix to retreat to avoid being cut off from his supply lines. On June 30, 1521, the French were beaten at the Battle of Noain, which gave the kings of Castile control over Navarre.

During the fragile peace which had followed the election of Charles V, the English arbitrated between France and the Holy Roman Empire. Following the Field of the Cloth of Gold, Henry VIII of England and his minister Thomas Wolsey made an alliance with the young emperor. In June 1521, Francis I of France first accepted the mediation of the English. Threatened on several fronts, the financial crisis that struck the French forbade the rapid emergence of a new army.

The Duke of Bouillon had been making incursions into Flanders for several weeks when Imperial forces invaded northern France on 20 August. Troops commanded by Count Franz de Nassau-Sickingen moved on Mouzon.

== The siege ==
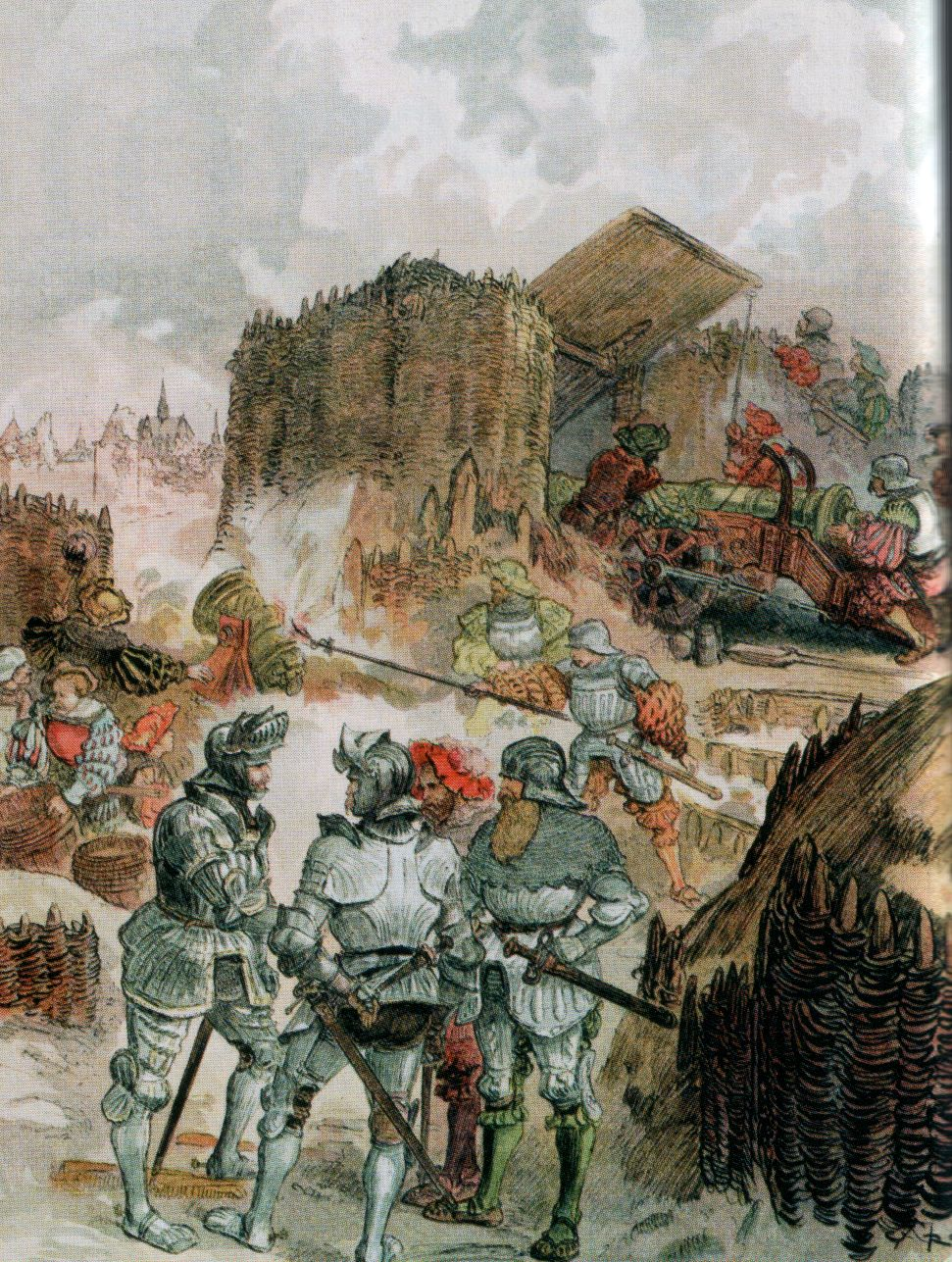
A 1909 illustration of the siege of Mézières

During the siege the villagers took refuge in the citadel of Mézières. Defended by Bayard with only 1,000 men, the fortress found itself besieged by nearly 35,000 of Nassau's soldiers. The Imperial lines passed south-east of Manicourt. The siege lasted six weeks, which included an initial three weeks of intensive bombardment. Bayard found himself in a desperate situation, since the king, due to a lack of money, was unable to intervene. During the siege of the fortress, the neighbouring villages of Champeau and Manicourt (where the imperial troops were encamped) were set ablaze .

Pierre Terrail, seigneur de Bayard commanded the defenders. He wrote false letters to Francis I that he knew would be intercepted by the enemy. The letters informed the king that Mézières was abundantly supplied and well defended, that it could withstand a long siege, and aid need not be sent. Deceived by this news, the invaders became discouraged and abandoned their attack. Nassau-Sickingen then ravaged the east part of Picardy by crossing the Meuse, pillaging and destroying the villages along the Sormonne in the Ardennes, before returning to Hainaut.

== Aftermath ==
When Wolsey proposed a truce with France, it was rejected. Francis had won enough time to gather an army near Reims and prevent further incursions on his territory. This victory was soon followed by others, with the recovery of Parma by Lautrec and the conquest of the strategic place of Hondarribia by Bonnivet.

== Sources ==
- Blockmans, Wim (2002). Emperor Charles V, 1500–1558. Translated by van den Hoven-Vardon, Isola. New York: Oxford University Press. ISBN 978-0-340-73110-9.
- Hackett, Francis. (1937) Francis the First. Garden City, New York: Doubleday, Doran & Co..
- Rouy, H. (1913) 'Le siège de Mézières cette ville défendue par Bayard (1521)', in Almanach-Annuaire historique administratif et commercial de la Marne, de l'Aisne et des Ardennes. Matot-Braine, Reims. p196–201.
