= John George of Montferrat =

Italian noble (1488–1533)

John George, Marquis of Montferrat
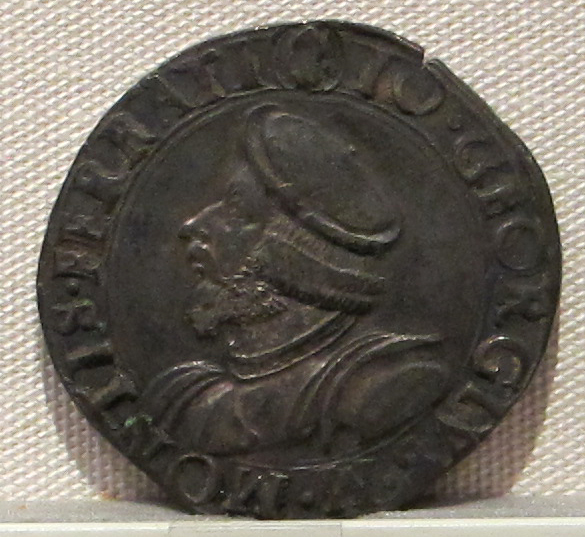

Marquis of Montferrat
- Reign: 1530–1533
- Predecessor: Boniface IV of Montferrat
- Successor: Margaret Palaiologina
- Born: 20 January 1488; Casale Monferrato
- Died: April 30, 1533 (aged 45); Casale Monferrato
- Noble family: Palaeologus-Montferrat
- Spouse: Julia Trastamara of Naples
- Father: Boniface III, Marquis of Montferrat
- Mother: Maria of Serbia

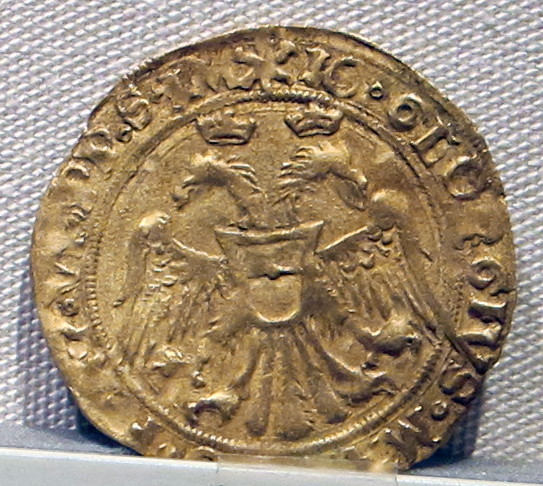
Gold coin of Gian Giorgio Paleologo, 1530–33.

John George of Monferrat (20 January 1488 – 30 April 1533) was the last Marquis of Montferrat of the Palaeologus-Montferrat family.

He was a son of Boniface III, Marquis of Montferrat and his third wife Maria of Serbia, daughter of Stefan Branković, Despot of Serbia and Angelina Arianiti, an Albanian princess.

== Reign ==
John George was Bishop of Casale when his nephew Boniface IV, Marquis of Montferrat unexpectedly died in 1530 without an heir.

As the last of his family and despite his poor health, John George had no option but to become the new Marquis. In a desperate attempt to produce an heir, he married the 41-year-old Julia, daughter of Frederick IV of Naples, on 21 April 1533. He died 9 days later.

After a Spanish occupation of 3 years, Montferrat came under Federico II Gonzaga, Duke of Mantua, who had married his niece Margaret Paleologa in 1531.

== Descendants ==
John George had an illegitimate son, Flaminio, from whom the Paleologo-Oriundi line allegedly descends and is extant today.

== Sources ==
- Haberstumpf, Walter (2009). Regesti dei Marchesi di Monferrato (secoli IX-XVI). Alessandria: San Giorgio Editrice.

== Ancestry ==
Ancestors of John George of Montferrat

16. John II, Marquis of Montferrat
8. Theodore II, Marquis of Montferrat
17. Isabella of Majorca
4. John Jacob, Marquis of Montferrat
18. Robert I, Duke of Bar
9. Joanna of Bar
19. Marie of Valois
2. Boniface III, Marquis of Montferrat
20. Amadeus VI, Count of Savoy
10. Amadeus VII, Count of Savoy
21. Bonne of Bourbon
5. Joan of Savoy
22. John, Duke of Berry
11. Bonne of Berry
23. Joan of Armagnac
1. John George Palaiologos, Marquis of Montferrat
24. Vuk Branković
12. Đurađ Branković
25. Mara Lazarević
6. Stefan III Brankovic prince of Serbia
26. Demetrios I Kantakouzenos
13. Irene Kantakouzene
27.
3. Maria of Serbia
28. Komnen Arianiti
14. Gjergj Arianiti
29. daughter of Nikollë Zaharia
7. Angelina Arianiti
Andrea III Muzaka, Despot of Musacchia
15. Maria Muzaka
Kirana Zenebishi, Lady of Grabossa

Preceded by Boniface IV	Marquis of Montferrat; 1530–1533	Vacant Spanish occupation Title next held by Frederick Gonzaga
