= Boniface IV of Montferrat =

Italian nobleman (1512–1530)

Boniface IV, Marquis of Montferrat
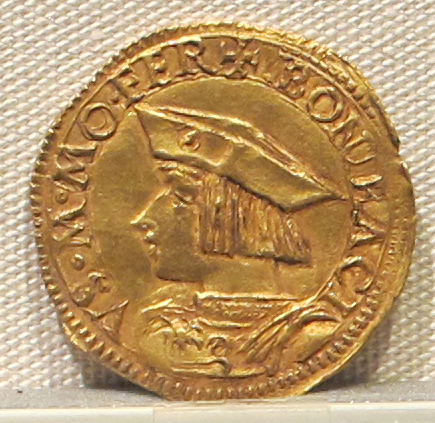
- Boniface IV, Marquis of Montferrat

Marquis of Montferrat
- Reign: 1518–1530
- Predecessor: William IX Palaiologos
- Successor: John George Palaiologos
- Born: 21 December 1512
- Died: 6 June 1530 (aged 17)
- Noble family: Palaeologus-Montferrat
- Father: William IX, Marquis of Montferrat
- Mother: Anne d'Alençon

Boniface IV Paleologo, Marquis of Montferrat (21 December 1512 – 6 June 1530) was an Italian nobleman. He succeeded his father William IX, Marquis of Montferrat in 1518. His mother was Anna d'Alençon (1492–1562).

Boniface never married and died childless in 1530, after falling from his horse. He was succeeded by his uncle, John George, Bishop of Casale.

== Sources ==
- Haberstumpf, Walter (2009). Regesti dei Marchesi di Monferrato (secoli IX-XVI). Alessandria: San Giorgio Editrice. ISBN 9788876790935.
