= René, Duke of Alençon =

15th c nobleman of the Valois Dynasty

René of Alençon
- Duke of Alençon; Count of Perche
- Born: 1454
- Died: 1 November 1492 (aged 37–38); Chateau d'Alençon
- Noble family: House of Valois-Alençon
- Spouses: Marguerite of Harcourt; Margaret of Lorraine
- Issue Detail: Charles IV, Duke of Alençon; Françoise of Alençon; Anne of Alençon
- Father: John II of Alençon
- Mother: Marie of Armagnac

Coat of arms of the counts and dukes of Alençon of the House of Valois.

Coat of arms of the counts of Perche.

René of Alençon (1454 – 1 November 1492) was a French nobleman. He succeeded his father Jean II of Alençon as Duke of Alençon.

== Life ==
René was born in 1454 to the House of Valois-Alençon. He was the son of John II of Alençon and Marie of Armagnac.

In 1478, he was restored as Duke of Alençon and Count of Perche, titles which had been confiscated from his family after his father's conviction in 1474, as part of agreeing to destroy fortifications on his land.

== Family ==
His first wife was Marguerite, daughter of William of Harcourt, Count of Tancarville.

He married a second time on 14 May 1488 at Toul, to Margaret of Lorraine (1463 – 1 November 1521), daughter of Frederick, Count of Vaudémont and Yolande of Anjou. Margaret bore him three children:

1. Charles IV of Alençon (1489–1525)
2. Françoise of Alençon (c. 1490 – 14 September 1550, La Fleche), Duchess of Beaumont, married 1505 in Blois, François, Duke of Longueville (d. 1512), married 1513 Charles, Duke of Vendôme
3. Anne (30 October 1492 – 18 October 1562, Casale Monferrato), Lady of la Guerche, married 31 August 1508 in Blois William IX Paleologos, Marquess of Montferrat

He also had several illegitimate children:

1. Charles (d. 1545), Lord of Cany
2. Marguerite, married 1485 Jacques de Boisguyon, married Henri de Bournel
3. Jacqueline, married Gilles des Ormes

== Sources ==
- Hickson, Sally Anne (2012). Women, Art and Architectural Patronage in Renaissance Mantua. Ashgate Publishing.
- Potter, David (1995). Keen, Maurice (ed.). A History of France, 1460–1560: The Emergence of a Nation State. Macmillan.

René, Duke of Alençon House of Valois-Alençon Cadet branch of the Capetian dynasty Born: 1454 Died: 1 November 1492
Preceded by John II	Duke of Alençon; 1478–1492	Succeeded by Charles IV
Preceded by John II	Count of Perche; 1478–1492	Succeeded by Charles IV
