= Margaret of Lorraine =

Duchess of Alençon

Blessed Margaret of Lorraine
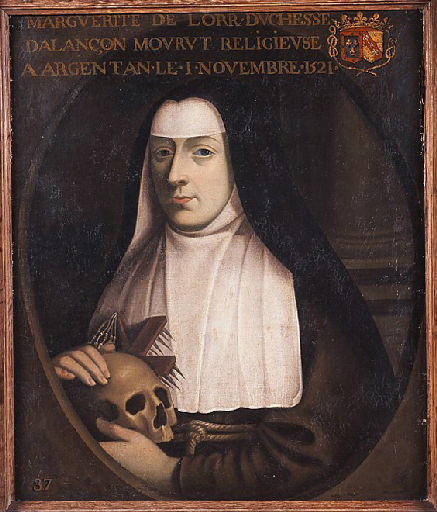

Duchess of Alençon
- Born: 1463; Castle of Vaudémont, Lorraine, France
- Died: 2 November 1521 (aged 58); Argentan, Normandy
- Venerated in: Roman Catholicism
- Beatified: 10 March 1921, Rome by Pope Benedict XV
- Feast: November 2

Margaret of Lorraine, Duchess of Alençon (1463 at the castle of Vaudémont, Lorraine – 2 November 1521 in Argentan, Normandy) was a French noblewoman and a nun of the order of Poor Clares (Ordre des Clarisses). She was beatified in 1921.

== Life ==
Margaret was born in 1463 in Vaudémont Castle, Lorraine as the youngest daughter of Frederick II, Count of Vaudémont and Yolande d'Anjou. She lost her father when she was the age of seven, and was brought up at Aix-en-Provence by her grandfather René of Anjou. When latter died in 1480, she was sent back to Lorraine to her brother, René II. He arranged her marriage to René, Duke of Alençon, whom she wed in Toul on 14 May 1488.

Margaret of Lorraine
- Duchess of Alençon
- Born: 1463; Castle of Vaudémont, Lorraine, France
- Died: 2 November 1521 (aged 58); Argentan, Normandy
- Noble family: House of Lorraine; House of Anjou
- Spouses: René of Alençon, Duke of Alençon
- Issue: Charles IV of Alençon; Françoise of Alençon, Duchess of Beaumont; Anne of Alençon, Lady of La Guerche
- Father: Frederick II, Count of Vaudémont
- Mother: Yolande d'Anjou

Alençon and Margaret had three children:

- Charles IV of Alençon (1489–1525), married Marguerite of Angoulême as her first husband.
- Françoise of Alençon, Duchess of Beaumont (1490 – 14 September 1550), married firstly in 1505, François, Duke of Longueville; married secondly in 1513, Charles de Bourbon, Duke of Vendôme, by whom she had thirteen children.
- Anne, Lady of La Guerche (30 October 1492 – 18 October 1562), married in 1508, William IX Palaeologos, Marquis of Montferrat by whom she had three children.

Margaret died on November 2, 1521, in Argentan, Orne from natural causes.

Almost 400 years after her death, she was beatified on March 10, 1921, by Pope Benedict XV.

== Widowhood ==
Left a widow in 1492, she busied herself in the administration of her duchy and the education of her children. She was known for her protection of the poor, and relentless in ensuring justice for widows and orphans. She travelled widely across her lands, inquiring into the conduct of local magistrates and reforming monasteries.When she was relieved of the duties imposed upon her by her position, she decided to renounce the world and retired to Mortagne, to a monastery of religious women who followed the rule of Saint Elizabeth. Later, having brought with her to Argentan some of these nuns, she founded there another monastery which she placed, with the authorization of the pope, under the rule of Saint Clare, modified by the Minor Observants.

She herself took the religious habit in this house and made her vows on 11 October 1520. On 2 November 1521, after having lived an austere life for a year, she died in her modest cell, at the age of fifty-eight. Her body, preserved in the monastery of the Poor Clares, and when that monastery was suppressed, was transferred to the church of Saint Germain d'Argentan. In 1793, during the French Revolution, it was profaned and thrown into the common burial place.

== Legacy ==
The memory of Margaret of Lorraine is preserved in the Martyrologium franciscanum and in the Martyrologium gallicanum. After an invitation made by the bishop of Séez, Jacques Camus de Pontcarré, Louis XIII asked Pope Urban VIII to order a canonical inquiry into the virtues and the miracles of the Duchess.
