= William IX of Montferrat =

Italian noble (1486–1518)

William IX
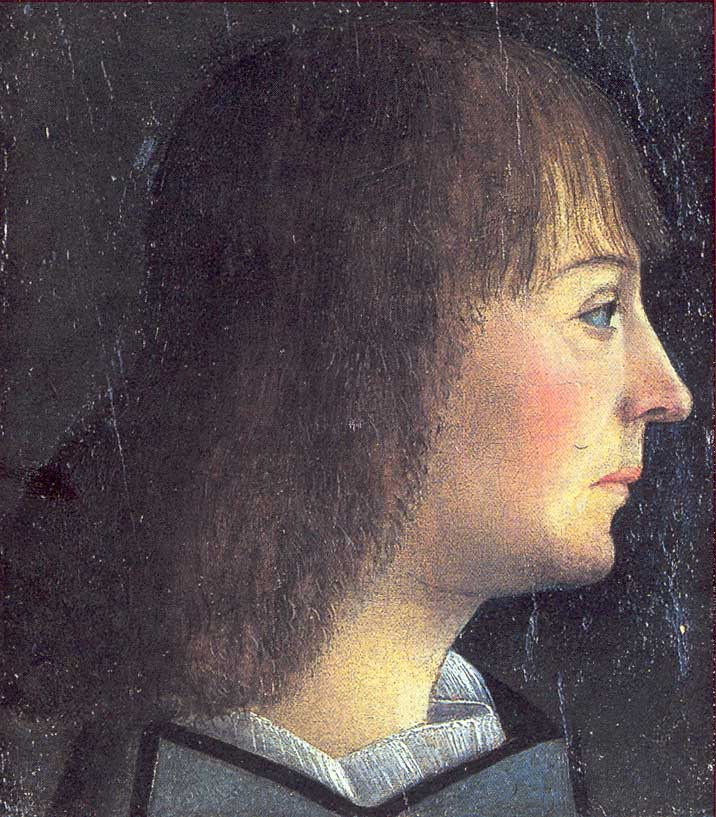
- Portrait by Macrino d'Alba

Marquis of Montferrat
- Reign: 1494–1518
- Predecessor: Boniface III Palaiologos
- Successor: Boniface IV Palaiologos
- Born: 10 August 1486
- Died: 4 October 1518 (aged 32); Trino
- Noble family: Palaeologus-Montferrat
- Spouse: Anna d'Alençon
- Issue: Maria Palaeologina; Margaret Palaeologina; Boniface IV of Montferrat
- Father: Boniface III of Montferrat
- Mother: Maria of Serbia

Coat-of-arms on a coin (testone) of William IX.

William IX Palaeologus (10 August 1486 – 4 October 1518) was Marquis of Montferrat from 1494 until his death. He was a member of the House of Palaeologus-Montferrat, a cadet branch of the Palaiologos dynasty which had once ruled the Byzantine Empire.

== Biography ==
He was the son of Marquis Boniface III and Maria of Serbia. At the time when he succeeded his father (1494), William was still a minor. At first, his mother acted as regent. After her death (1495), the regency passed to his mother's uncle Constantine Komnen-Arianiti (1495-1499).

He continued the pro-French policy of his father and, in 1508, he married Princess Anna d'Alençon, daughter of René d'Alençon. During the Italian Wars, in 1513, he protected the French retreat from Milan; however, to avoid retaliation from Maximilian Sforza, William was forced to pay him 30,000 scudi.

The Milanese Duke did not respect the treaty, and his troops invaded Montferrat and sacked numerous cities. At the same time, informed that his relative Oddone, Marquis of Incisa, was trying to obtain the title of Marquis of Montferrat, William marched to Incisa and occupied that lordship. Oddone and his son Badone were sentenced to death. However, the annexation was later declared null by Holy Roman Empire diplomacy, but in the subsequent year, William was able to maintain the new lands.

He had 3 children with Anna d'Alençon:

- Maria (1509–1530),
- Margherita (1510–1566), married Duke Federico II Gonzaga of Mantua
- Boniface IV (1512–1530)

He died in 1518 and was succeeded by his son Boniface IV, initially with his mother Anne d'Alençon as regent.

== Sources ==
- Haberstumpf, Walter (2009). Regesti dei Marchesi di Monferrato (secoli IX-XVI). Alessandria: San Giorgio Editrice. ISBN 9788876790935.

William IX of Montferrat Palaeologus-Montferrat Cadet branch of the Palaiologos dynasty Born: 10 August 1486 Died: 1518
Regnal titles
Preceded by Boniface III	Marquis of Montferrat; 1494–1518	Succeeded by Boniface IV
