= Federico II Gonzaga of Mantua =

Federico II Gonzaga
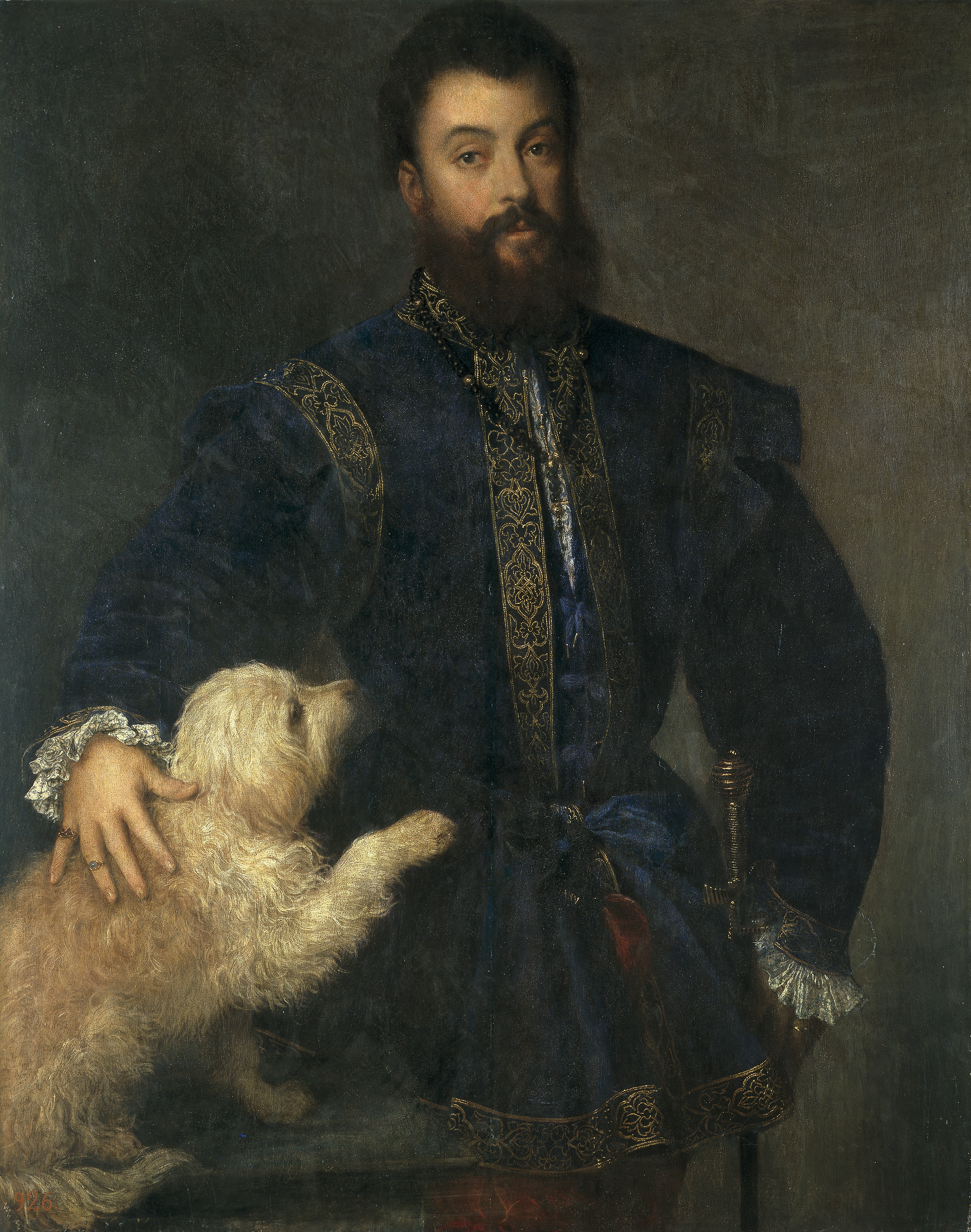
- Portrait of Federico II Gonzaga by Titian

Marquis of Mantua
- Reign: 3 April 1519 – 25 March 1530
- Predecessor: Francesco II

Duke of Mantua
- Reign: 25 March 1530 – 28 June 1540
- Successor: Francesco III

Marquis of Montferrat
- Reign: 30 April 1533 – 28 June 1540
- Predecessor: John George
- Successor: Francesco III
- Born: 17 May 1500; Mantua, Margravate of Mantua
- Died: 28 August 1540 (aged 40); Marmirolo, Duchy of Mantua
- Spouse: Margaret Paleologina
- Issue: Francesco III Gonzaga, Duke of Mantua; Isabella Gonzaga; Guglielmo Gonzaga, Duke of Mantua; Louis Gonzaga, Duke of Nevers; Federico Gonzaga, Cardinal of Monferrato
- House: Gonzaga
- Father: Francesco II Gonzaga, Marquess of Mantua
- Mother: Isabella d'Este

Federico II of Gonzaga (17 May 1500 – 28 August 1540) was the ruler of the Italian city of Mantua (first as Marquis, later as Duke) from 1519 until his death. He was also Marquis of Montferrat from 1536.

== Biography ==
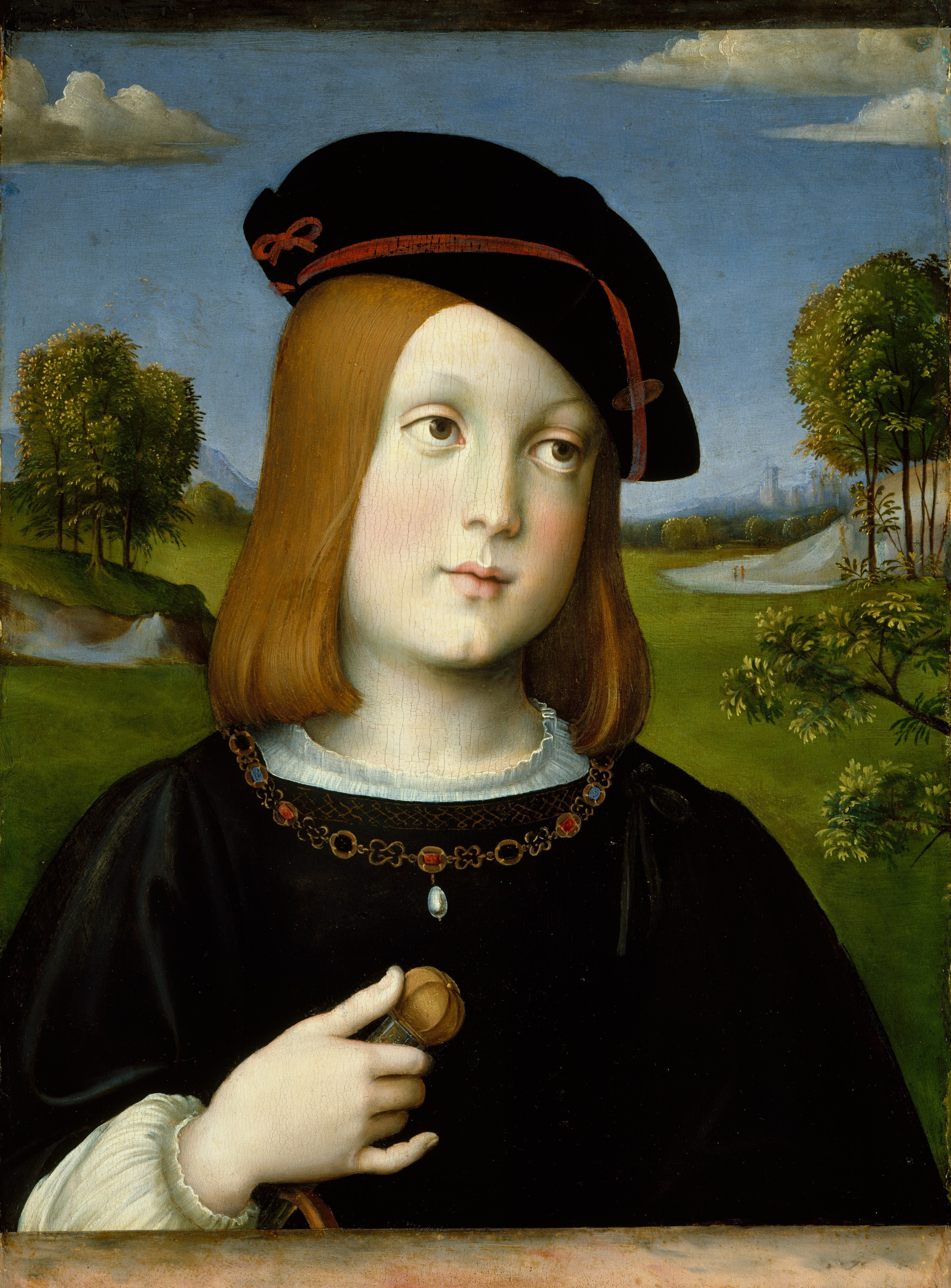
Portrait of Federico II (age 10) soon after becoming a hostage, by Francesco Francia

Federico was son of Francesco II Gonzaga, Marquess of Mantua and Isabella d'Este. Due to the turbulent politics of the time, from the age of ten, he spent three years as a hostage in Rome under Pope Julius II. From 1515 to 1517, Federico was the hostage of King Francis I of France, to ensure Gonzaga assistance in Italy. During these "formal hostage" situations, Federico served as a diplomatic representative of his family while gaining courtly experience for his later life.

On 3 April 1519, Federico succeeded his father as Marquis of Mantua, initially under the regency of his mother and his uncles Sigismondo and Giovanni Gonzaga. He received the imperial investiture from emperor Charles V on 7 April 1521. Pope Leo X named him Captain General of the Church (commander in chief of the Papal Army) in July 1521, and he fought against the French at Parma in 1521 and at Piacenza in 1522.

Federico signed a marriage contract with the heir to the Marquisate of Monteferrat, Maria Palaeologina, with the aim of acquiring that land. In 1528, however, in exchange for two prisoners, Pope Clement VII voided the marriage contract.

Federico then signed another marriage contract with Charles V's third cousin, Julia of Aragon. In lieu of this move, in 1530 he was granted the ducal title, whereby their dynasty became Dukes of Mantua. However, when Boniface, Marquis of Montferrat, died from a fall from a horse on 25 March of that year, Federico paid 50,000 ducats to Charles in exchange for the annulment of the contract, and pushed the pope for the restoration of his earlier marriage agreement. When Maria also died, he was able to marry her sister Margaret on 3 October 1531. At the death of the last legitimate male heir of the Palaiologos family, Giovanni Giorgio (1533), the marquisate of Montferrat passed to the Gonzaga, who held it until the 18th century.

Like his parents, he was a patron of the arts. His experience of spending three years in Rome as a hostage and the influences from his mother disposed him to greatly appreciate Roman arts, both modern and ancient. During his time in Rome under Pope Julius II, he was tutored by a man named Ausonius (Ausonio), who was already in the service of Bartolomeo della Rovere. His studying began on the 23rd of April, 1511.Federico also learned many skills from spending time with the Pope and the other prominent roman families in his court. During this time he acquired a taste for the festivals and parties, like the Carnival in 1512 or dinner at the monastery of St. Gregory with the poet Bernardo Accolti.

His access to works from Michelangelo and Raphael nourished a taste for large fresco decorations with writing, illusionist effects and muscular forms. While he did fail in acquiring works by Sebastiano del Piombo or Michelangelo, he did acquire several works of Correggio. Federico sent agents to Rome and Venice to acquire works of art, usually through artists, collectors, or secondhand dealers. He sometimes took advantage of unusual circumstances, as well. In 1527, during the sack of Rome, he sent a letter to the Imperial commander and mercenary Captain Fabrizio Maramaldo asking him if any pieces or complete statues and busts that had been looted were for sale. He commissioned the Palazzo Te, designed and decorated by Giulio Romano, as his summer palace just outside Mantua. The palace's erotic and poetic imagery presented Federico as a ruler shaped by ideals of love, masculinity, and emotional suffering. Romano spent 16 years as court artist under Federico's patronage. Romano and Federico often exchanged gifts of art or Greek and Roman antiquities. At the Mantuan court, the Duke received gifts from Mantuan gentlemen as an offering in order to demonstrate their commitment and curry favour. His relationship with Romano appeared to have been unique and shows the artist as a valued courtier and trusted client. Federico was engaged in a life-long affair with Isabella Boschetti, often conducted in the Palazzo, which contained numerous paintings by Romano celebrating the love between the couple. He also bought and commissioned several paintings from Titian, and had his portrait painted by both Titian and Raphael. A 1535 notarial contract provides evidence for the introduction of Flemish paintings into Italy through Federico's court, showing that Mantua was connected to the wider European art market during his rule.

Federico suffered long from syphilis, like his father. He died on 28 June 1540 at his villa at Marmirolo. His son Francesco briefly held the title of 2nd Duke of Mantua before dying in his teens; the second son, Gugliemo, became 3rd Duke of Mantua as well as Duke of Montferrat and carried on the line.

== Family and issue ==
Coat of arms of Federigo II

Federico and Margaret were parents to seven children:

- Eleonora Gonzaga.
- Anna Gonzaga.
- Francesco III Gonzaga, Duke of Mantua (10 March 1533 - 22 February 1550)
- Isabella Gonzaga, married Francesco Ferdinando d'Ávalos
- Guglielmo Gonzaga, Duke of Mantua (24 April 1538 - 14 August 1587), married Archduchess Eleanor of Austria
- Louis Gonzaga, Duke of Nevers (22 October 1539 - 23 October 1595). Father of Charles I, Duke of Mantua
- Cardinal Federico Gonzaga (1540 - 21 February 1565).

== Ancestry ==
Ancestors of Federico II Gonzaga of Mantua

8. Ludovico III Gonzaga, Marquis of Mantua
4. Federico I Gonzaga, Marquess of Mantua
9. Barbara of Brandenburg
2. Francesco II Gonzaga, Marquess of Mantua
10. Albert III, Duke of Bavaria
5. Margaret of Bavaria
11. Anna of Brunswick-Grubenhagen-Einbeck
1. Federico II Gonzaga, Duke of Mantua
12. Niccolò III d'Este, Marquis of Ferrara
6. Ercole I d'Este, Duke of Ferrara
13. Ricciarda, Marchioness of Saluzzo
3. Isabella d'Este
14. Ferdinand I of Naples
7. Eleanor of Naples
15. Isabella of Clermont

== See also ==
- Sack of Rome
- Italian Wars

== Sources ==
- Cockram, Sarah D. P. (2013). Isabella d'Este and Francesco Gonzaga: power sharing at the Italian Renaissance Court. Farnham: Ashgate Publishing Ltd. ISBN 9781409448310. OCLC 855504802.
- Fenlon, Iain (1980). Music and Patronage in Sixteenth-Century Mantua. Vol. 1. Cambridge University Press.
- Hickson, Sally Anne (2016). Women, Art and Architectural Patronage in Renaissance Mantua: Matrons, Mystics, and Monasteries. Routledge.
- Murphy, Paul V. (2007). Ruling Peacefully: Cardinal Ercole Gonzaga and Patrician Reform in Sixteenth-Century Italy. Catholic University of America Press.
- Parrott, David (1997). "The Mantuan Succession, 1627–31: A Sovereignty Dispute in Early Modern Europe". The English Historical Review. CXII, Issue 445, February (445). Oxford Academic: 20–65. doi:10.1093/ehr/CXII.445.20.
- de Pins, Jean (2007). Letters and Letter Fragments. Librairie Droz S.A.
- Barbieri, N. I. (2012). Cultura letteraria Intorno a Federico Gonzaga, Primo Duca Dimantova (thesis).

Federico II Gonzaga of Mantua House of Gonzaga Born: 17 May 1500 28 August
Regnal titles
Preceded by Francesco II	Marquis of Mantua; 1519–1530	Elevated to Duke
New title	Duke of Mantua; 1530–1540	Succeeded by Francesco III
Vacant Spanish occupation Title last held by John George Palaeologus	Marquess of Montferrat; 1533–1540	Succeeded by Francesco III
