= Portrait of Federico II Gonzaga (Francesco Francia) =

1510 painting by Francesco Francia

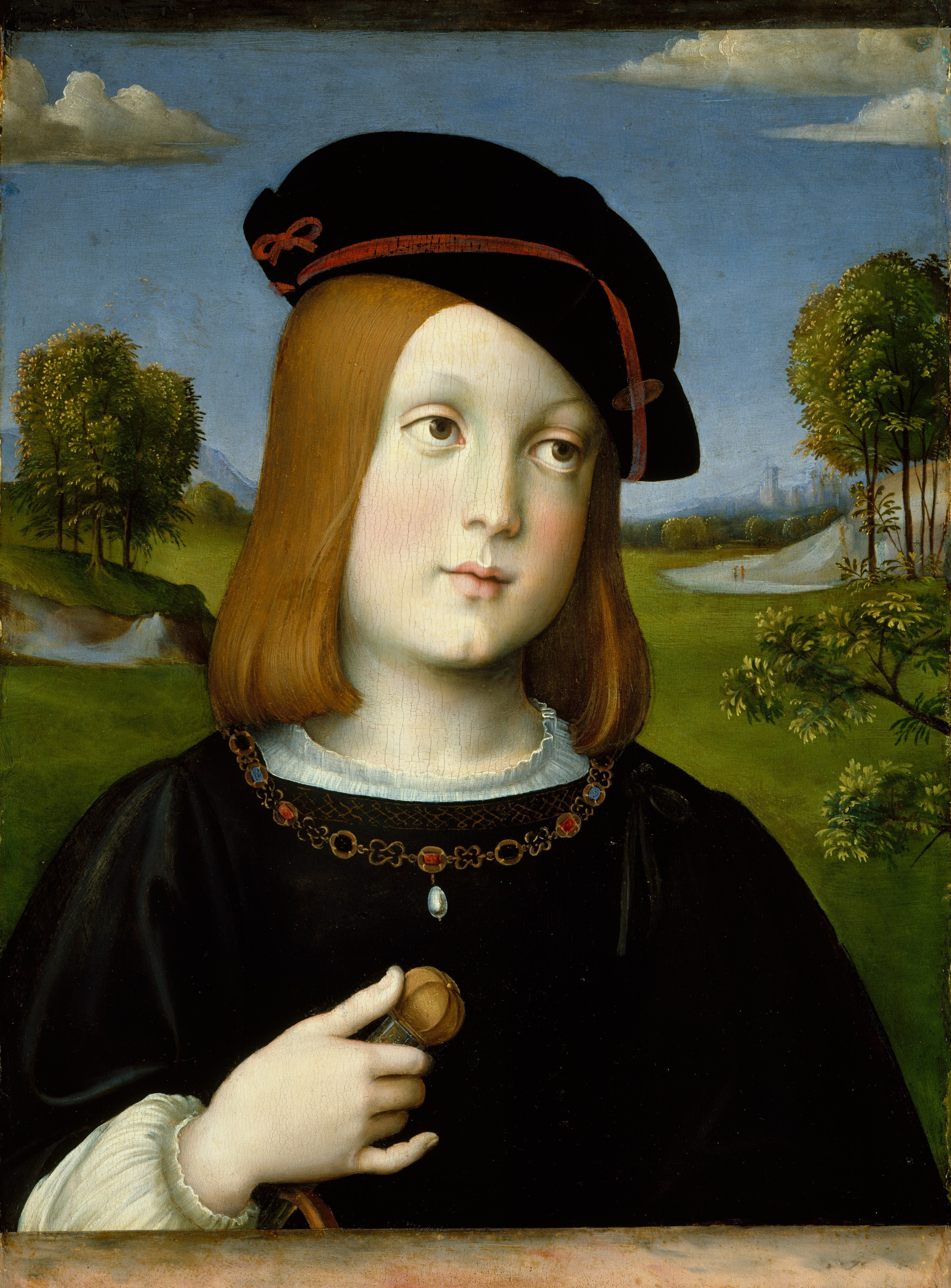
- Artist: Francesco Francia
- Year: 1510
- Type: Oil on wood transferred to canvas and finally again on wood
- Subject: Federico II Gonzaga (age 10)
- Dimensions: 45 cm × 34 cm (18 in × 13 in)
- Location: Metropolitan Museum of Art, New York
- Accession: 14.40.638

Portrait of Federico II Gonzaga (also called Portrait of Federigo Gonzaga) is a Renaissance portrait of a young boy by Francesco Francia in the Metropolitan Museum of Art in New York. The painter as author, the year 1510 and Federico II Gonzaga (portrayed at the age of 10) are considered to be sure, since conforming information is documented by numerous letters.

== Description ==
The bust shows a young boy with a black beret and black upper garment. Rather old-fashioned for the time, he stands behind a balustrade in front of a landscape. The body is (according to Francia's portrait scheme) almost frontal and the head in 3/4 profile, here looking up to the right. The boy has medium blond hair and brown eyes with hanging lower eyelids below strongly arched eyebrows. In his hand he holds (despite his childish age) the pommel of a sword. Around his neck he wears a rich gold chain with a white pearl (symbol of innocence). On the barett a medal is placed under the hatband.

Despite transfer from wood to canvas and back, the painting is in excellent condition, i.e. restored. On the shirt (collar and sleeves) are remains of a former gilding. Stylistically, the portrait is in transition Quattrocento (e.g. background and symmetrical bow on the beret) and High Renaissance (e.g. imprecise shirt folds and asymmetrical bow on the black upper dress).

== History ==
Federico II Gonzaga (born 1500) was the eldest son of Francesco II Gonzaga, Marquis of Mantua, and his wife Isabella d'Este. During the Italian Wars, the father fell into Venetian captivity in 1509 and offered his firstborn as a hostage. At the end of July 1510, the hostage was handed over to Pope Julius II. At this handover in Bologna, the boy's portrait was painted within only 12 days by Francesco Francia as a memorial painting for his mother. The latter praised the excellent likeness, but requested a slight darkening of the hair colour.

The handing over of the hostage resulted in a dependency of the House of Gonzaga (Marquisate of Mantua) on the Holy League (1511), which is why the Gonzaga sided with the League in the subsequent battles against her long-time allies France and the House of Este (Duchy of Ferrara). In 1511 Isabella d'Este (married Gonzaga) commissioned Francesco Francia again, this time to paint her own portrait. In 1512 she gave the two Francia portraits, Mother and Child, to an acquaintance in Ferrara, who exhibited them both as counterparts for discussion at evening events. These events are suspected to have been a political image making by Isabella d'Estes after the betrayal of her homeland.

In 1872, the boy's portrait reappeared at a Christie's Auction in London, and in 1903 it was identified by Herbert Cook as the Francia portrait of the young Federico II Gonzaga. In 1913, the painting finally entered the Metropolitan Museum as a donation from Benjamin Altman.

== See also ==
- Francesco Francia (especially his portraits)
- Federico II Gonzaga (life and especially his later portrait by Titian)

== Literature ==
- Andrea Bayer: Francesco Francia's Portrait of Federico Gonzaga and the Letter that Surround It. in: Artibus et historiae: an art anthology, ISSN 0391-9064, Nº. 80, 2019, pp. 95–104.
- Carolyn James: Political Image Making in Portraits of Isabella d’Este, Marchioness of Mantua. in: Gender & History, October 2021, pp. 1–22.
- Emilio Negro, Nicosetta Roio: Francesco Francia e la sua scuola. Artioli Editore, Modena 1998, ISBN 88-7792-057-2, portrait as cat.n. 70 (Italian).
