= The Gonzaga Family in Adoration of the Holy Trinity =

Painting by Peter Paul Rubens

Gonzaga Family in Adoration of the Holy Trinity
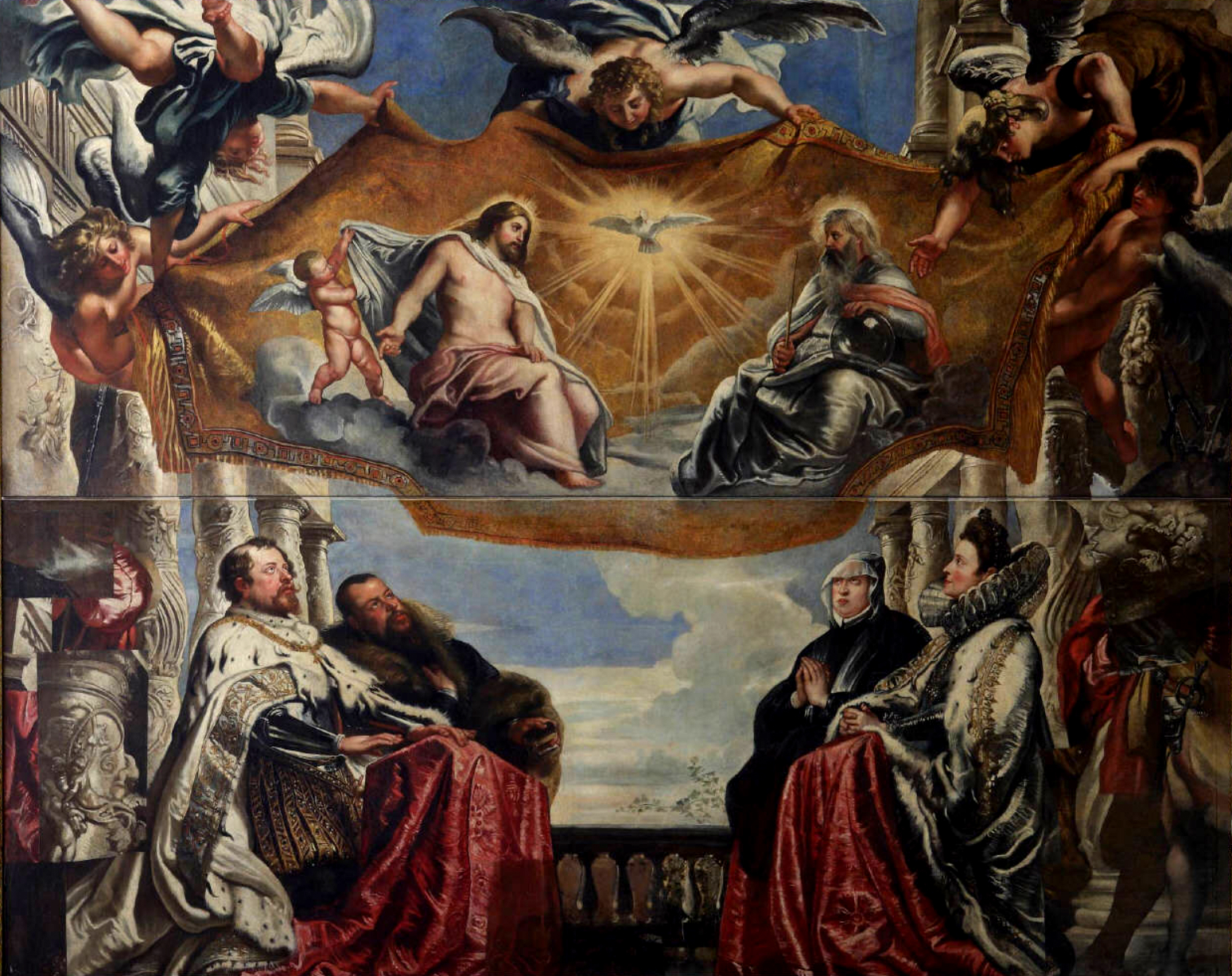
- Artist: Peter Paul Rubens
- Year: 1604–1605
- Medium: Oil on canvas
- Dimensions: 381 cm × 477 cm (150 in × 188 in)
- Location: Ducal Palace, Mantua

The Gonzaga Family in Adoration of the Holy Trinity (also, The Trinity Adored by the Gonzaga Family or The Gonzaga Trinity) is a painting by the Flemish artist Peter Paul Rubens, housed in the Ducal Palace in Mantua, Italy. The work was commissioned by Duke Vincenzo I Gonzaga for the Jesuit church in Mantua, while Rubens was his court painter.

The work represents the central part of a triptych, of which the two side panels were the Transfiguration and the Baptism of Christ. During the 19th-century French occupation of northern Italy in the Napoleonic Wars, the work was split, and some portions were lost.

The canvas portrays Vincenzo I and his wife Eleonora de' Medici near images of the duke's parents, Guglielmo Gonzaga and Eleonore of Austria. Also depicted are several of their children with some halberdiers, one of whom is Rubens's self-portrait.

== History ==
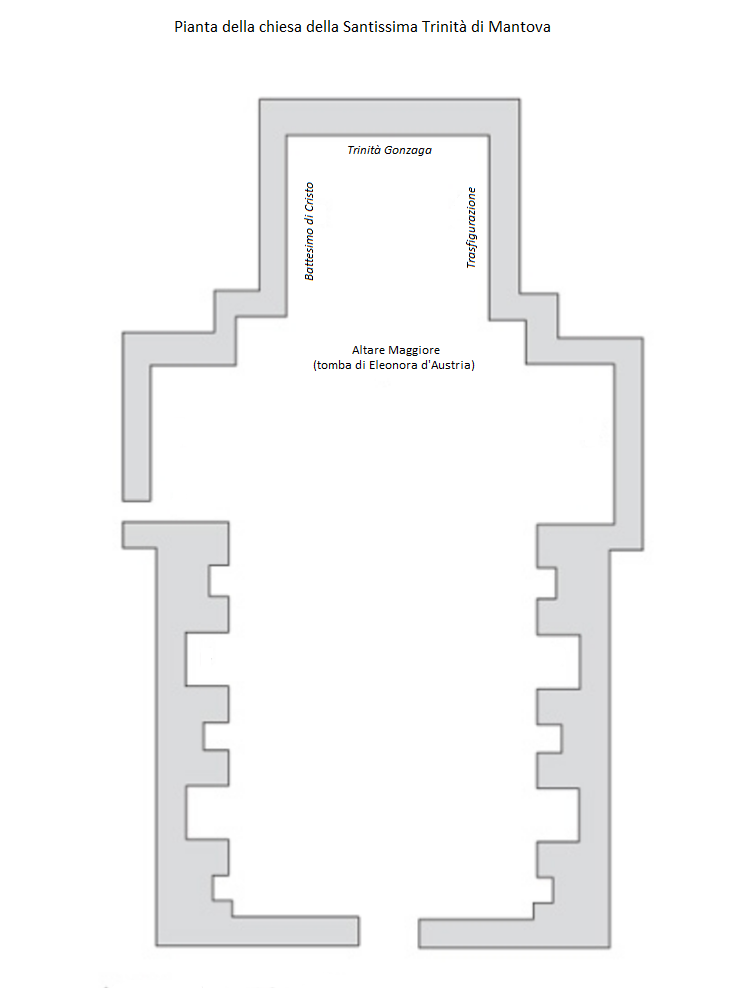
Location of the Rubens cycle in the Church of the Holy Trinity, Mantua

The painting was commissioned by Duke Vincenzo I Gonzaga as the culminating work of a large cycle that comprised two other large canvases in the main chapel of the Church of the Holy Trinity in Mantua. The two other paintings depicted The Baptism of Christ and The Transfiguration and were located on the side walls of the chapel, while the Gonzaga Trinity was placed on the middle wall as the center of the triptych. The work was made between 1604 and 1605 and was inaugurated on the occasion of the Feast of the Trinity of 1605.

The Church of the Holy Trinity was built to welcome the Society of Jesus to Mantua. The settlement of the Jesuits in the Gonzaga duchy was favored, above all, by the offices of the cardinal Ercole Gonzaga but their great benefactor was also Archduchess Eleanor of Austria, wife of the Duke Guglielmo Gonzaga. The Archduchess was most devoted to the Society (her personal confessor was a Jesuit) and promoted the construction of the Mantuan church of the Trinity, for which the Rubens cycle was created. The same church was chosen by Eleonor of Austria as the place of her burial: her remains were placed under its main altar, right in front of the presbytery chapel adorned by the Rubens paintings.

The whole Rubens cycle, consistent with the dedication of the church that holds it, references the Catholic divine Trinity. It is clearly the theme of the Gonzaga Trinity but it is also recalled by the side paintings in the triptych. According to Catholicism, both the baptism of Christ and his transfiguration were moments of divine manifestation in which the divine nature of Christ as the "Son of God" were revealed, that is, as a member of the Trinity. In that way, the iconography of the Mantuan chapel corresponds to those of the Church of Jesus in Rome—an important Jesuit church. There the central altarpiece depicts the Trinity, flanked by Christ's baptism and transfiguration.

The Mantuan triptych
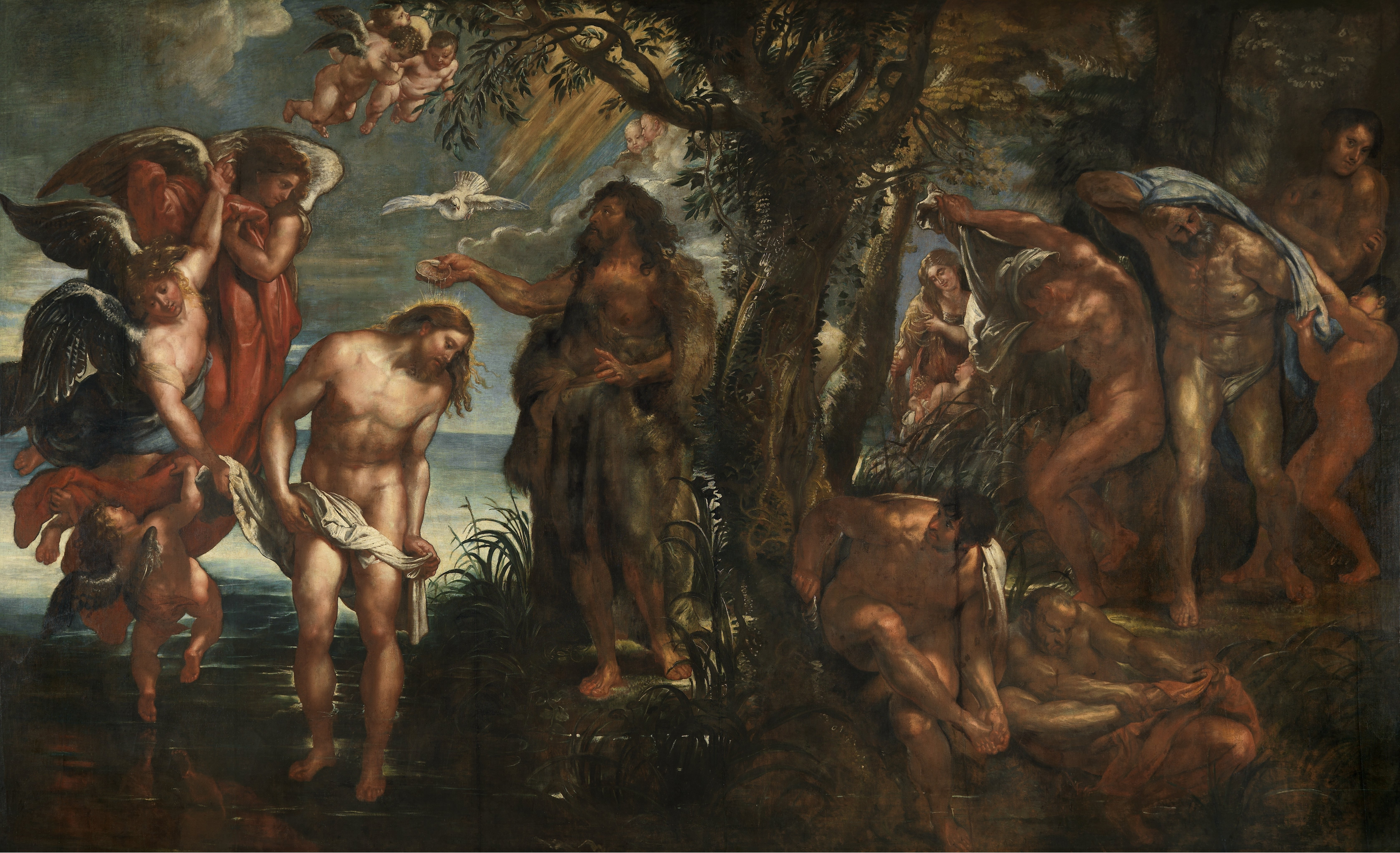
Rubens, Baptism of Christ, 1604-1605, Antwerp, Koninklijk Museum voor Schone Kunsten

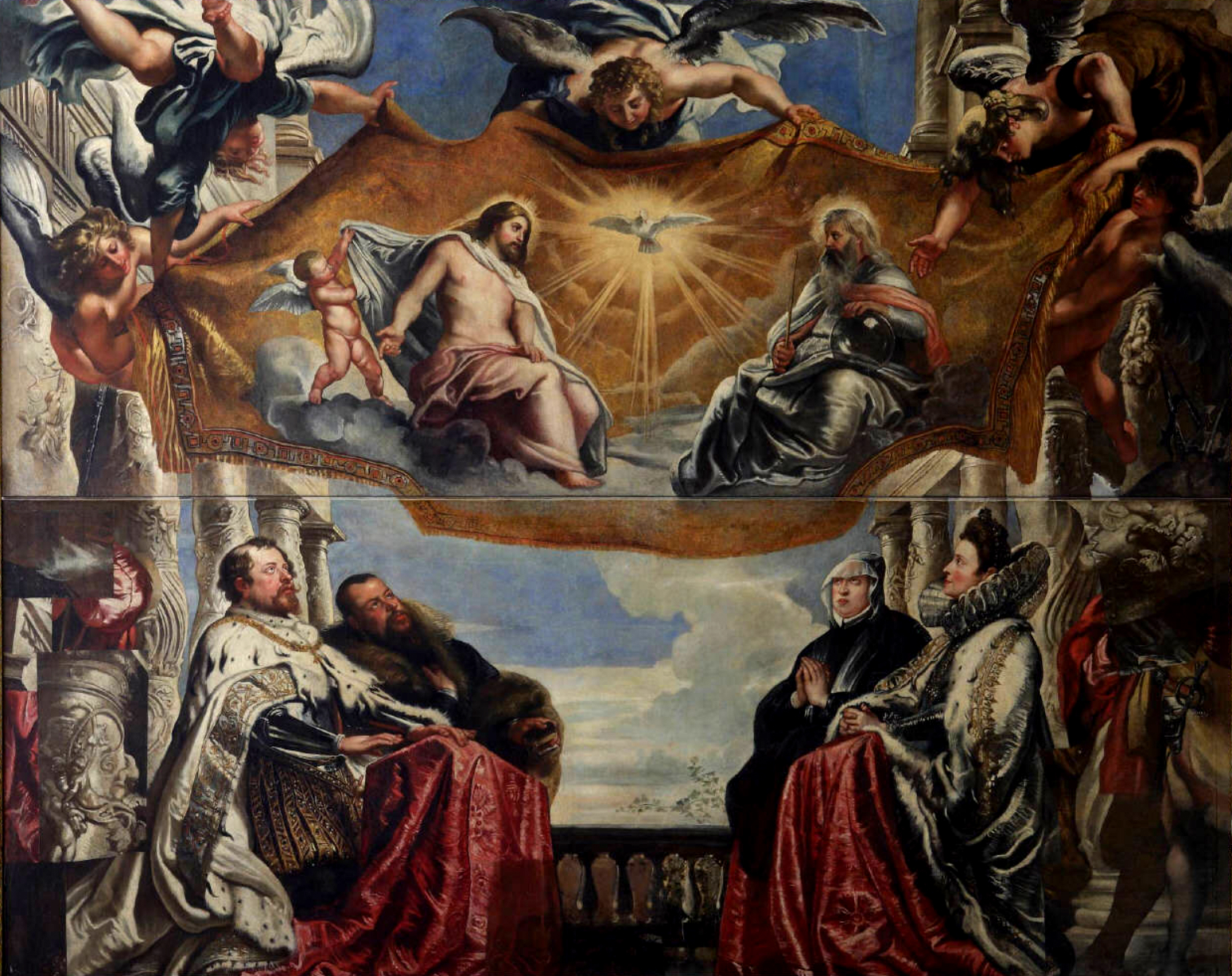
Rubens, The Gonzaga Family Worshipping the Holy Trinity

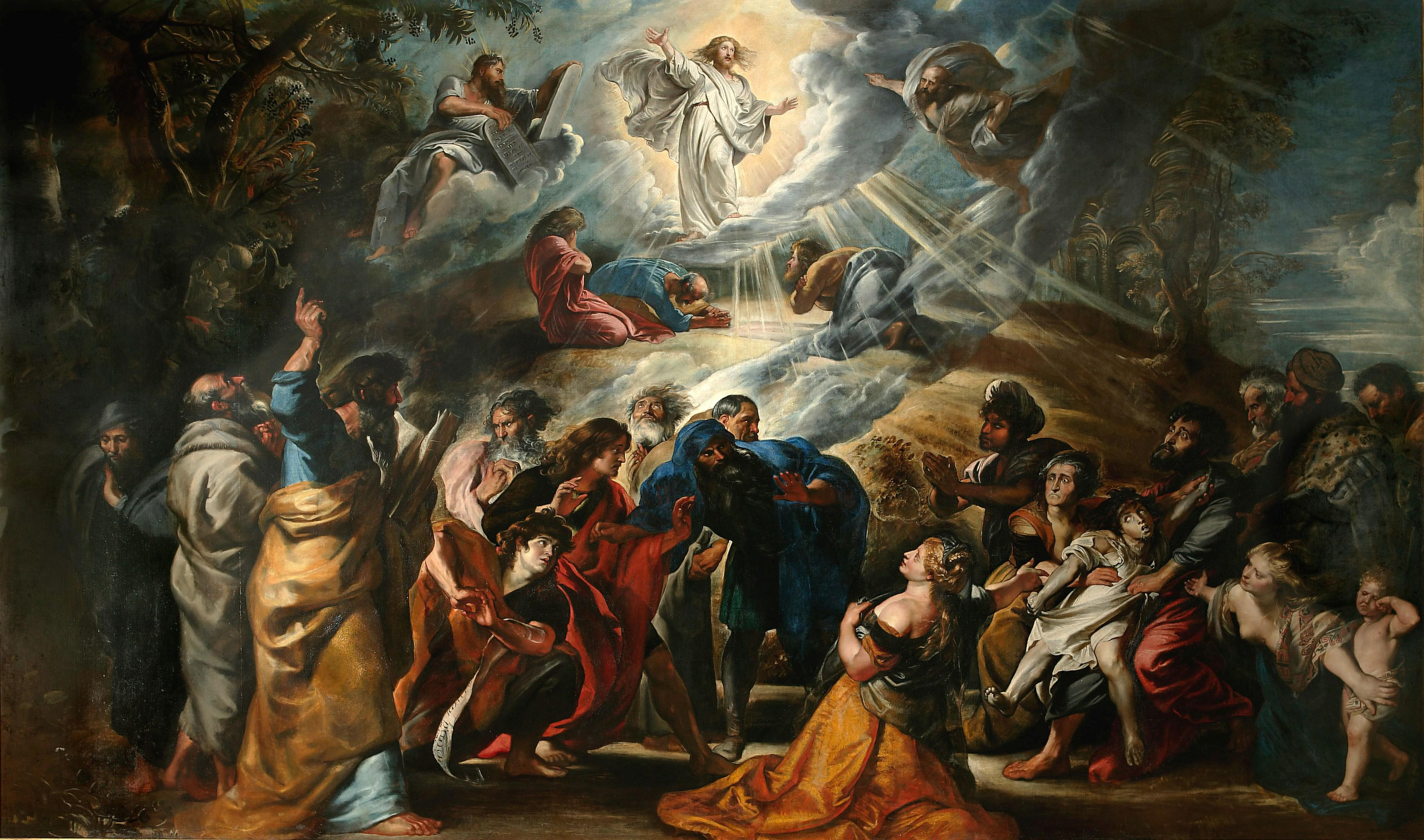
Rubens, Transfiguration, 1604-1605, Nancy, Musée des Beaux-Arts

The three Rubens paintings remained in their original places up to the Napoleonic occupation of Mantua in 1797. In the period of Napoleonic looting, the Church of the Holy Trinity was sacked and the Flemish paintings were removed by the commissioner Etienne-Marie Siauve. The side canvases were taken over the Alps, where they can be found today (The Baptism at Antwerp and The Transfiguration at Nancy).

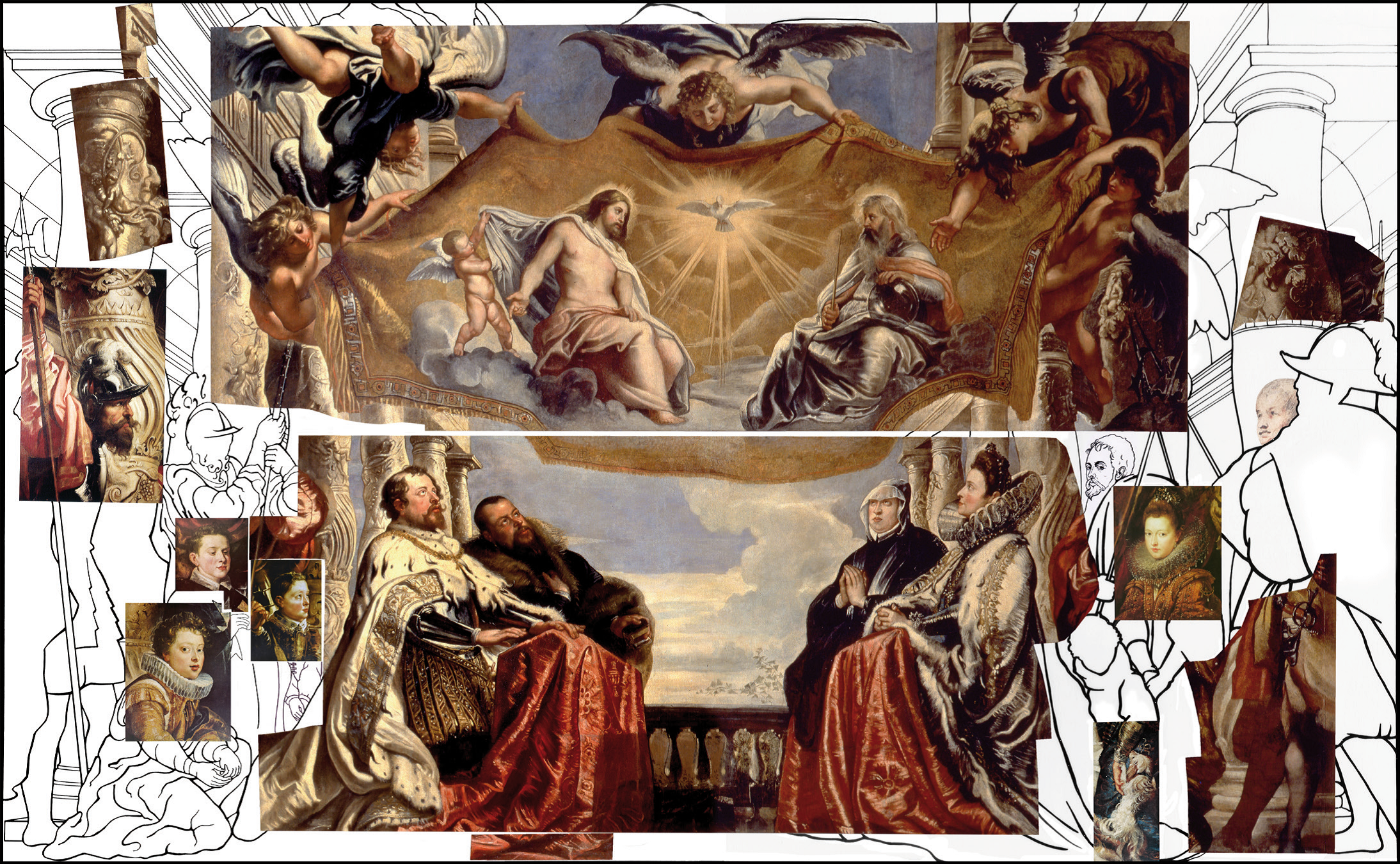
Reconstruction of The Gonzaga Family in Adoration of the Holy Trinity as it is displayed at the Palazzo Ducale in Mantua

The central painting, the Gonzaga Trinity, had a more unfortunate fate. It was cut into several sections by soldiers: sections in which the sons of Vincenzo Gonzaga and Eleonora de' Medici appeared along with several court guards were subdivided into various fragments, which mostly contained the portrait's faces and many of which are lost. The center of the composition was cut in two, horizontally. These two parts have been, as much as possible, reassembled and are now in the Ducal Palace of Mantua. Several of the partial fragments that can't be reintegrated into the rest of the painting are also kept there.

== Description and style ==
The painting depicts an open-air scene in a gallery with, on the side, two rows of richly historiated, twisted columns and a balustrade in perspective. At the center of the gallery, on the left, are Vincenzo Gonzaga and his father Guglielmo Gonzaga behind him. On the right, on the first floor, is Vincenzo's wife Eleonora de' Medici. Behind her is the mother of the duke, Eleonora d'Austria. Both Guglielmo Gonzaga and his wife Eleonora were already dead by the time of the painting's making.

As much as it's possible to reconstruct the composition, the children of the ducal couple were represented on the sides (almost below the colonnade). The male children to the left, and to the right the female. On the left, therefore, were Francesco Gonzaga of Ferdinando Gonzaga and Vincenzo II Gonzaga, while on the right Margherita and Eleonora Gonzaga were depicted. Always on the sides of the painting were included some halberdiers, of the Swiss guards. One of them is a self-portrait of Rubens.

When the painting was cut apart, the side sections were removed and reduced to pieces to extract the portraits of the children as paintings in their own right. These portraits where all divided (they are now found in various different places) with the exception of Eleonora Gonzaga. The only fragment referring to the future empress Eleonora is that of the little dog, which the girl was caressing (as testified in old descriptions of the work). Among the other identified fragments, there is also one of the halberdiers, although it is not the self-portrait of Rubens.

The entire family group is kneeling in prayer, while the Holy Ghost appears above. The composition's depiction of the ducal family is similar to sculpture groups by Leone and Pompeo Leoni at El Escorial that represent the family of Carlo V and Philip II of Spain. Rubens could have seen those sculptures during his diplomatic voyage to Spain in 1603 for Vincenzo Gonzaga.

The choice of this resemblance is not casual, but is an explicit homage to the Spanish crown to reiterate the loyalty of the Gonzagas to the Hapsburg monarchy. The family also wears clothes of Spanish style, such as the collar of the Order of the Golden Fleece worn by the Duke—an important honor conferred by the Hapsburgs as heirs of the Dukes of Burgundy. The presence of the Swiss guards are also ultimately references to the pro-Hapsburg stance of the Gonzagas.

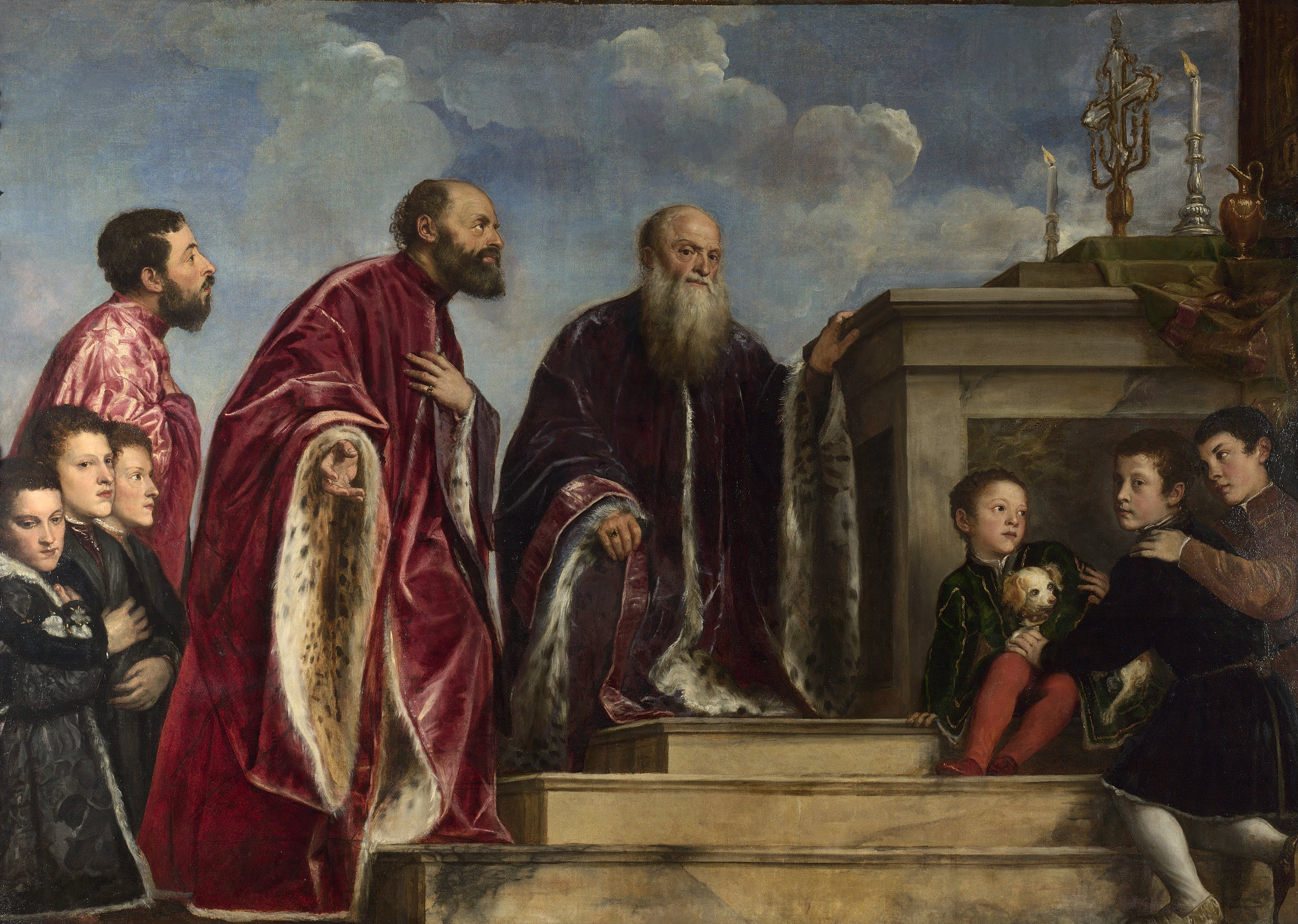
The Vendramin Family, Venerating a Relic of the True Cross, Titian and workshop, early 1540s

In the painting's stylistic plan, however, Rubens draws on 16th century Venetian traditions. A little before beginning the cycle for the Jesuit church, Rubens had in fact completed a study trip to Venice. His composition recalls, in particular, so many group portraits of aristocratic Venetian families in prayer. One good example is the family Vendramin by Titian. Rubens's painting also shows the influence of Paolo Veronese and Tintoretto. The chromatic ranges, the effects of the light, the open atmosphere, and the facial anatomy all refer to their precedents.

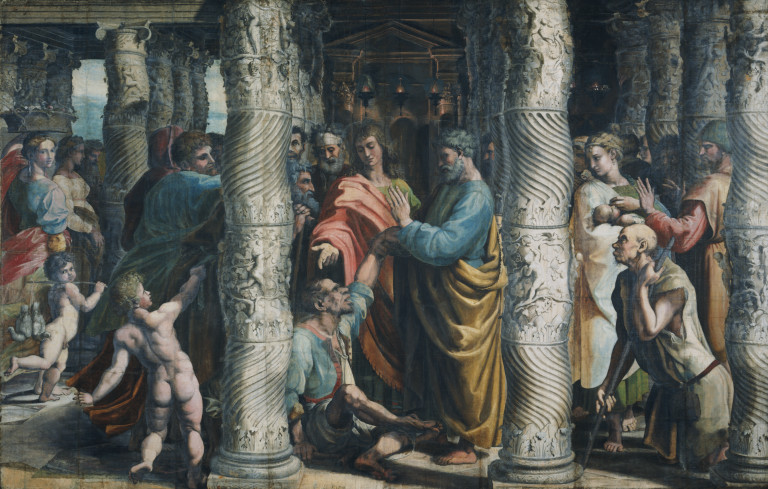
The Healing of the Lame Man, Raphael, 1515

Nor does the painting lack references to Raphael: indeed, educational trips to Rome were one of the fundamental steps of the young Rubens. The twisted columns of the gallery are clearly examples of Raphael's drawing The Healing of the Lame Man. Their twisted design recalls those of the legendary Temple of Solomon, which according to ancient belief were brought to Rome and used to build the Basilica of Saint Peter. The reproduction of these columns in the painting might allude to how the coming of Christ is the improvement and verification of the Old Testament (since they symbolize the Solomonic columns).

Near the top of the composition, a group of angels unrolls a golden tapestry on which the Holy Trinity is represented. This compositional choice has a single reason, it is a meditation in line with the severe dictates of the Council of Trent for religious depictions. According to those, a direct appearance of the divine to the laity would be inappropriate. Still, the Christ on the tapestry points to his father with his hand and the Duke clearly reacts to that gesture. In that way, the self-celebration of the work is revealed, as it divinely legitimizes Gonzaga's role as a sovereign.

Finally, just beyond the balustrade, an ivy branch that seems to almost touch Eleonora d'Austria is visible. The branch is a tribute to the mother of the Duke and is linked to the intended location of the painting: the ivy appears, in the enterprise of the Archduchess of the Hapsburgs, as a symbol of conjugal devotion (since this plant can't live if separated from the tree to which it is attached). The tribute to the deceased mother of the Duke adds, perhaps, to the idea that her female virtues are an example to all the women of the Gonzaga family, united in adoration.

== Preparatory drawings ==
There are three known preparatory drawings for The Gonzaga Family in Adoration of the Holy Trinity. Two studies of Ferdinand and Francesco Gonzaga are stored together in the Nationalmuseum of Stockholm, and one study of a halberdier is in the Royal Library of Belgium in Brussels.

For the decorative plan of the chapel at the Church of the Holy Trinity, there is also a beautiful drawing for The Baptism at the Louvre. Rubens's studies for the Mantuan cycle are among his oldest that are known, with relatively certain dating.

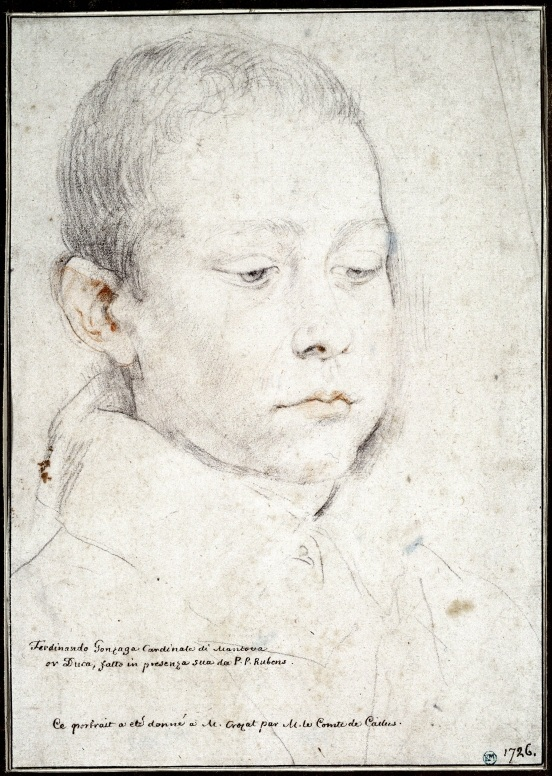
Study for the portrait of Ferdinand Gonzaga

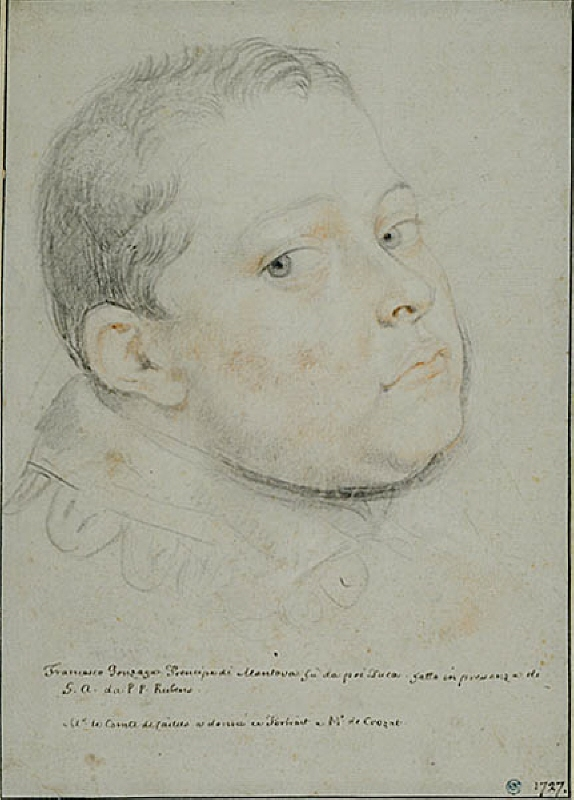
Study for the portrait of Francesco Gonzaga

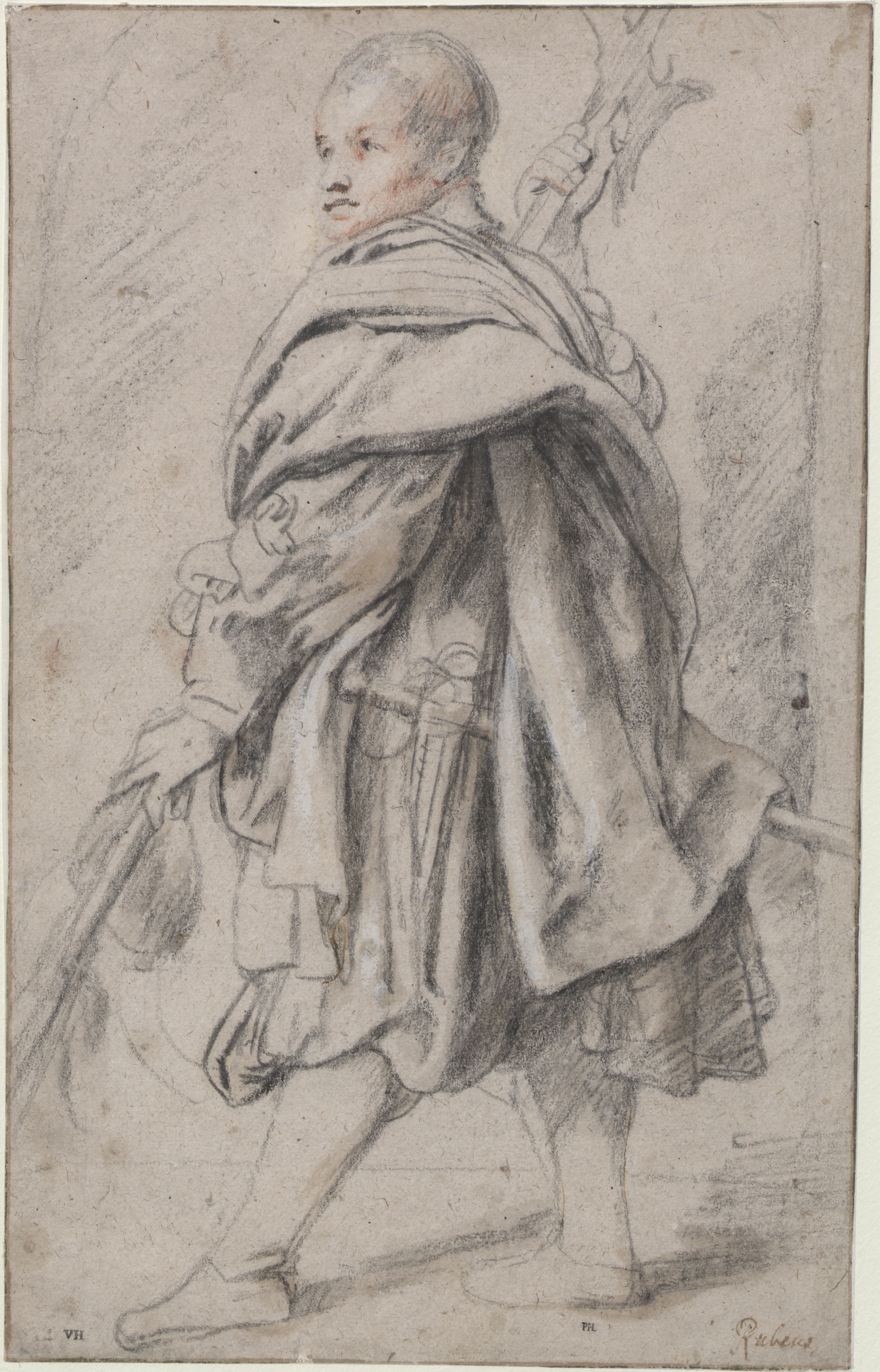
Study of a halberdier

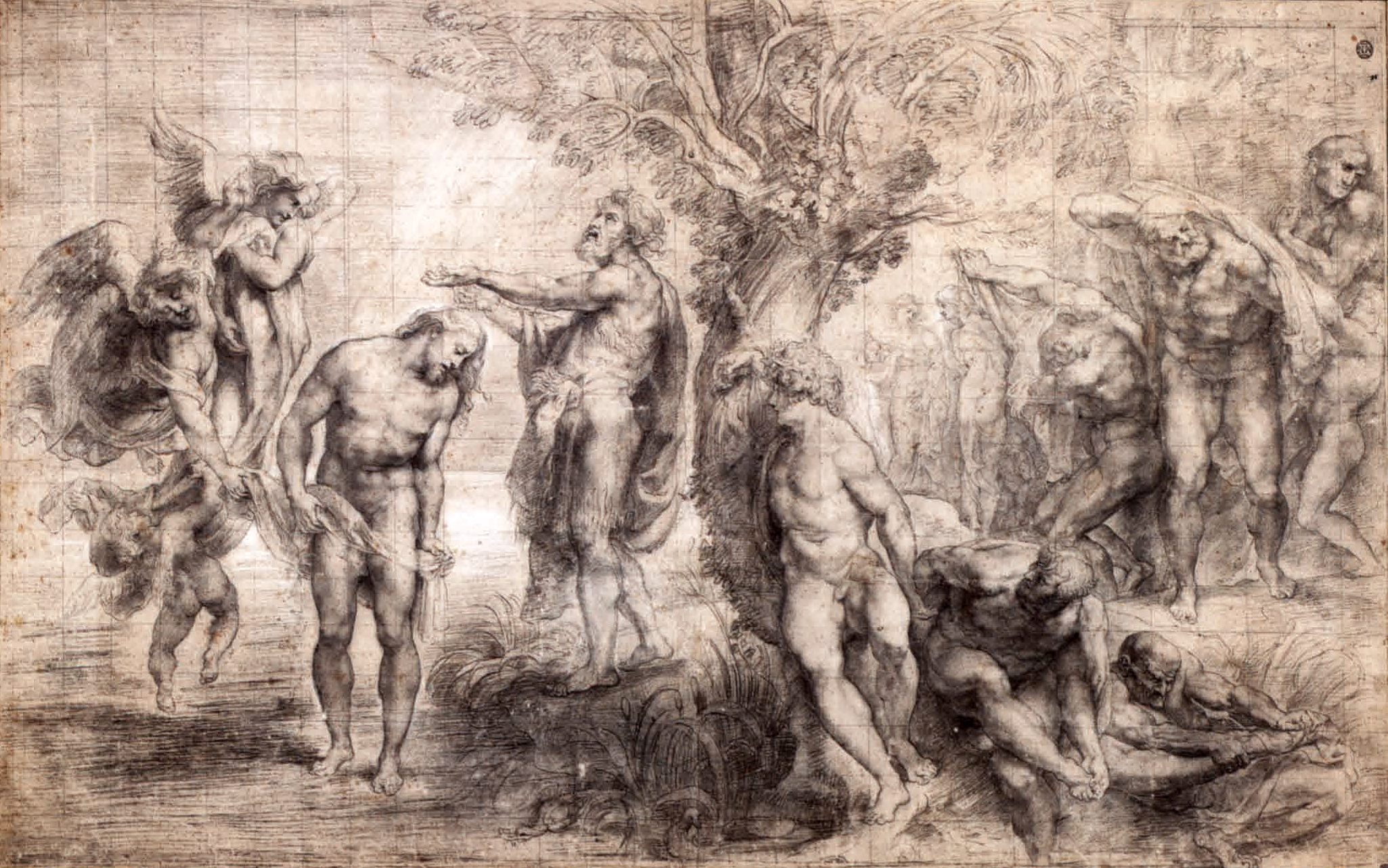
Study for The Baptism of Christ
