= Ippolita Gonzaga =

Italian noblewoman (1503–1570)

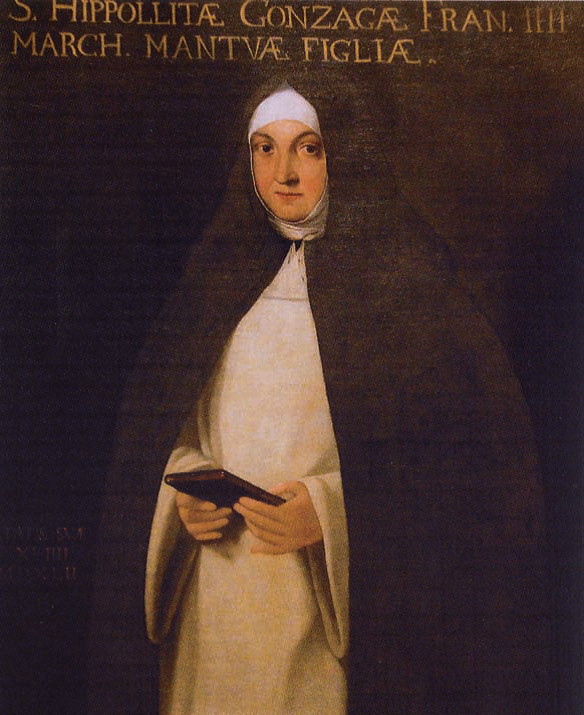
Ippolita Gonzaga.

Ippolita Gonzaga (13 November 1503 in Mantua – 16 March 1570 in Mantua) was an Italian noblewoman and nun. She is not to be confused with her niece Ippolita Gonzaga (1535–1563) the daughter of Ferrante Gonzaga, who married in 1549 Fabrizio Colonna, hereditary prince of Paliano, and in 1554 Antonio Carafa, duke of Mondragone.

== Biography ==
Gonzaga was the daughter of Francesco II Gonzaga, Marquis of Mantua and Isabella d'Este, daughter of Ercole I d'Este, Duke of Ferrara. In 1511, she was entrusted by her mother to the Dominican monastery of San Vincenzo in Mantua. In 1518 Ippolita took her vows as Livia Hosanna, Hosanna in honor of the Dominican tertiary Andreasi and friend of Isabella d'Este. She obtained significant aid for the convent from her brother Cardinal Ercole Gonzaga, who often visited her. A portrait of her as a youth may be present in a 1515 altarpiece by Francesco Bonsignori preserved in the museum of the city of Mantua. She died in 1570 in Mantua.
