= Zacchi =

Zacchi is a surname. Notable people with the surname include:

- Cesare Zacchi (1941–1991), Italian Catholic prelate
- Francesco d'Antonio Zacchi (c. 1407–1476), Italian painter
- Gioele Zacchi (born 2003), Italian footballer
- Jean-Marie Zacchi (born 1944), French painter
- Zaccaria Zacchi (1473–1544), Italian painter and sculptor
