= Ercole Gonzaga =

Italian Catholic cardinal (1505–1563)

His Eminence Ercole Gonzaga
- Bishop of Mantua
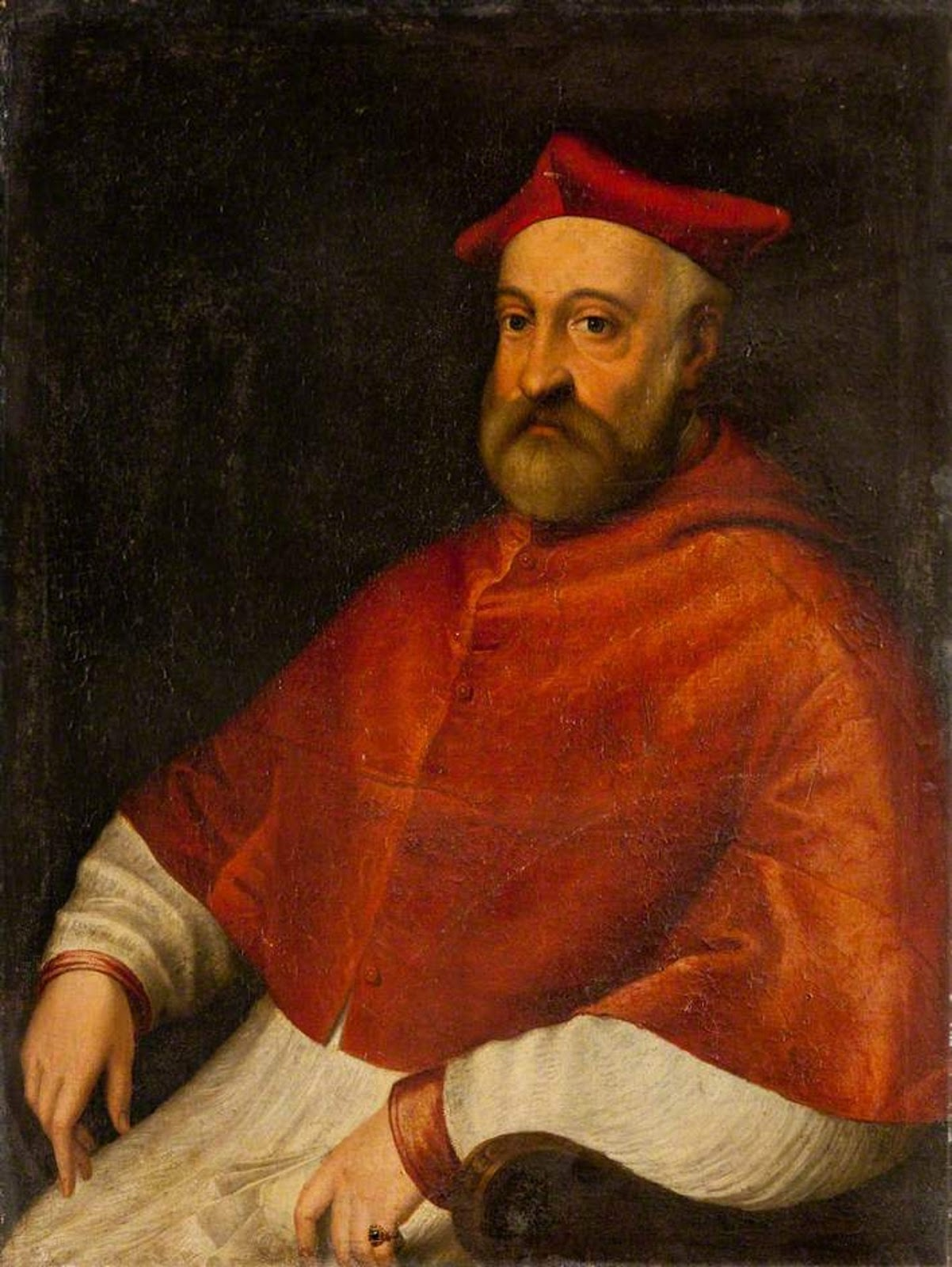
- Portrait by Scipione Pulzone, 16th century
- Church: Roman Catholic Church
- Diocese: Diocese of Mantua
- See: Mantua
- Appointed: 10 May 1521
- Term ended: 2 March 1563
- Predecessor: Sigismondo Gonzaga
- Successor: Federico Gonzaga
- Other post: Cardinal-Priest of Santa Maria Nuova (1556–1563)
- Previous post: Cardinal-Deacon of Santa Maria Nuova (1527-1556)

Orders
- Created cardinal: 3 May 1527 by Pope Clement VII
- Rank: Cardinal-Priest

Personal details
- Born: Ercole Gonzaga; 23 November 1505 Mantua, Italy
- Died: 2 March 1563 (aged 57) Trento, Italy
- Parents: Francesco II Gonzaga, Marquess of Mantua; Isabella d'Este
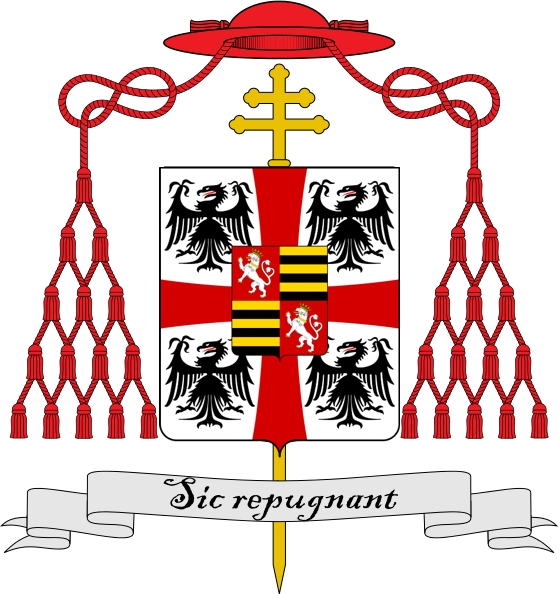
- Coat of arms

Ercole Gonzaga (23 November 1505 – 2 March 1563) was an Italian Cardinal.

== Biography ==
Born in Mantua, he was the son of the Marquis Francesco Gonzaga and Isabella d'Este, and nephew of Cardinal Sigismondo Gonzaga. He studied philosophy at Bologna under Pietro Pomponazzi, and later took up theology.

In 1520, or as some say, 1525, Sigismondo renounced in his favour the See of Mantua; in 1527 his mother Isabella brought him back from Rome the insignia of the cardinalate. He was chosen to be a cardinal at the very young age of 20, this quick ascention to power being the fruit of the diplomatic mastery of Isabella Gonzaga.

Gonzaga was an enthusiastic reformer, with support from his friend Cardinal Giberti, Bishop of Verona. Like his friends Contarini, Gilberti, and Caraffa, he published a Latin catechism for the use of the priests of his diocese and built a diocesan seminary. The 1913 Catholic Encyclopedia describes his lifestyle as "stainless", citing his manuscript Vitae Christianae institutio as evidence.

His substantial charitable donations included many university scholarships. The popes employed him on many embassies, e.g. to the Emperor Charles V in 1530. Because of his prudence and his business-like methods, he was a favourite with the popes, with the Charles V and Emperor Ferdinand I, and with Francis I of France and Henry II of France.

From 1540 to 1556 he was guardian to the young sons of his brother Federico II Gonzaga who had died, and in their name he governed the Duchy of Mantua. The elder of the boys, Francesco, died in 1550 and was succeeded by his brother Guglielmo.

In the Papal conclave, 1559 it was thought he would certainly be made pope; but the cardinals would not choose as pope a scion of a ruling house. In 1561 Pope Pius IV named him papal legate to the Council of Trent, for which he had from the beginning laboured by every means at his command, moral and material. In its early stages, because not a few considered he was in favour of Communion under both kinds, he met with many difficulties, and interested motives were attributed to him. He contracted fever at Trento, where he died, attended by Diego Laynez.
