= San Giovanni in Zoccoli, Viterbo =

Church in Viterbo, Italy

Coordinates: 42.41781°N 12.10875°E

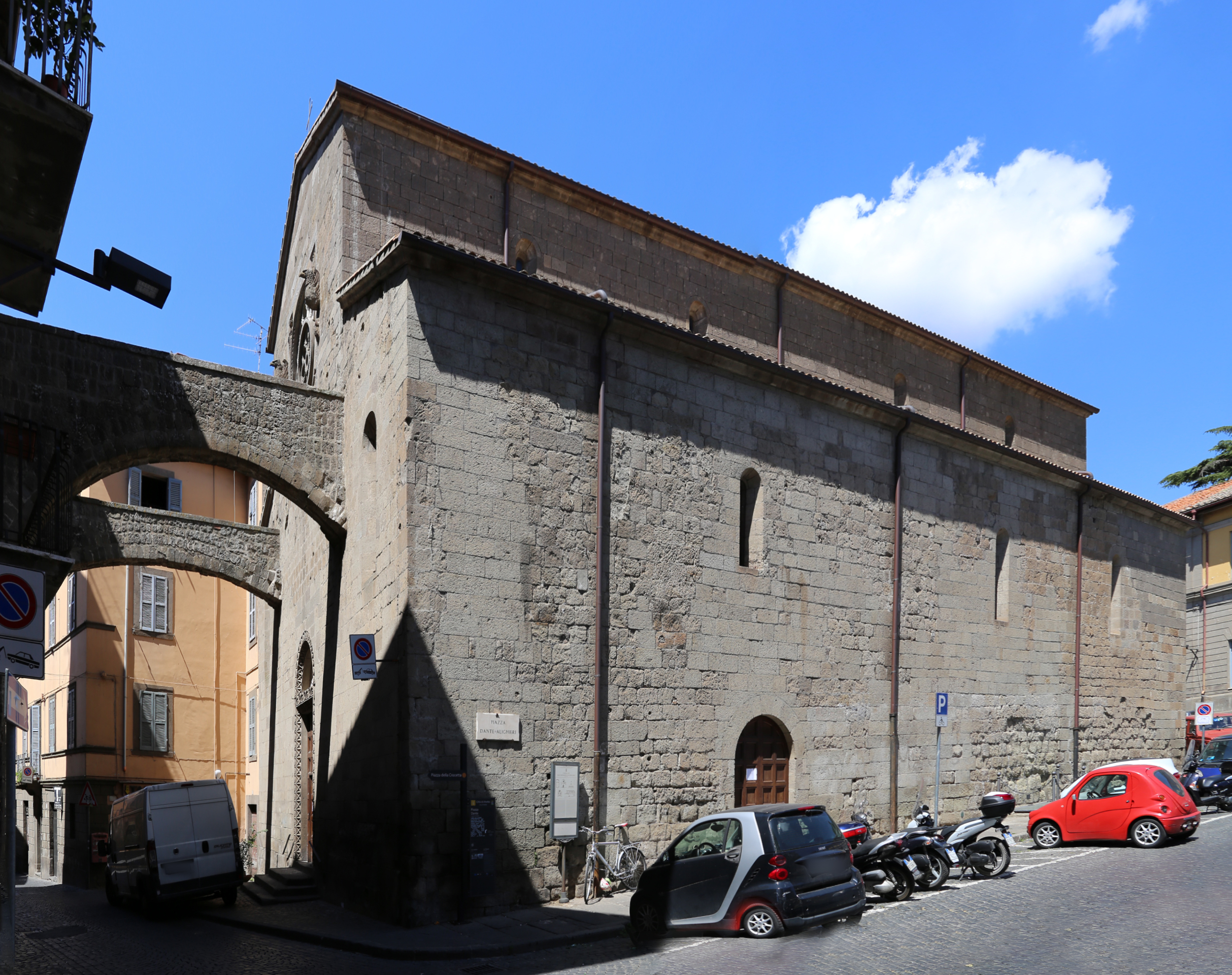

San Giovanni in Zoccoli (St John in Sandals) is an Romanesque and Gothic-style, Roman Catholic church located in Via Mazzini #8 in Viterbo in the Region of Lazio, Italy.

== History ==
Little documentation exists about the foundation of the church. Some reports mention a church bell damaged by lightning bore a data of 1037. Others claim a 823 document from the monastery of Monte Amiata mentions a San Giovanni in Sonsa or Sconcio, which may refer to this church. The church is apparently dedicated to St John the Evangelist, and thus two eagles flank the rose-window on the facade. The church underwent refurbishment in 1880 and after the allied aerial bombardment of Viterbo in 1944; these have left the church stripped of the former baroque decoration. During the earlier refurbishment, Giovanni Battista Cavalcaselle helped restore the fresco above the portal of the facade.

The facade has a round rose window surrounded by the symbols of the four evangelists, and additional two eagles. Peculiarly, the facade is stabilized by buttresses connected to the house in front. The lunette of the portal, defined by a frame of stars and a depiction of the Evangelist. The interior layout has on central nave, flanked by Romanesque columns with decorated capitals, and two side aisles, all leading to semicircular Romanesque apses. There is not transept. The roof is wooden.

In the apse of the right nave is a polyptych (1441) by Francesco d’Antonio Zacchi. The center panel depicts an Enthroned Madonna and Child between Saints (from left to right) Peter, John the Baptist, John the Evangelist and Paul. In the left lateral panel from to bottom, are depicted Archangel Gabriel, Saints Francis, Leonardo, and Lucia; on the right, a Virgin of the Annunciation, Saints Antony Abbot, Helena and Catherine of Alexandria. In the medals of the tympani, are depicted the Trinity and then the Four Evangelists. At the base, are various scenes, some from stories or legends of the life of John the Evangelist: St George and the dragon, Domitian orders St John the Evangelist placed in vat of boiling oil, St John resurrects Drusiana, St John changed twigs to pebbles of gold and precious stones, St John's prayer Collapses the temple of Diana, St John drinks poison and remains unscathed, and the Adoration of the Wise Men. In the central apse, there thin stained glass window depicting St John the Evangelist.

Off the left nave is a chapel with a fresco of the Madonna and Child, detached from a wall of a house of Viterbo, as well as tombstones from churches in town.
