= Margaret of Bavaria, Marquise of Mantua =

Marchioness consort of Mantua (1442–1479)

Margaret of Bavaria
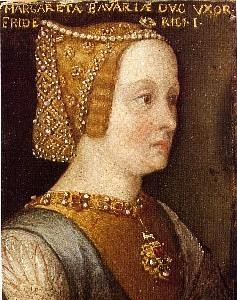
- Margaret of Bavaria
- Born: 1 January 1442; Munich
- Died: 14 October 1479 (aged 37); Mantua
- Noble family: House of Wittelsbach
- Spouse: Federico I Gonzaga, Marquis of Mantua
- Issue: Clara Gonzaga; Francesco II Gonzaga, Marquis of Mantua; Sigismondo Gonzaga; Elisabetta Gonzaga; Maddalena Gonzaga; Giovanni Gonzaga
- Father: Albert III, Duke of Bavaria
- Mother: Anna of Brunswick-Grubenhagen-Einbeck

Margaret of Bavaria (1 January 1442 – 14 October 1479) was a Marchioness consort of Mantua, married in 1463 to Federico I Gonzaga, Marquis of Mantua. She was regent in the absence of her husband during his military campaign in 1479.

== Life ==
Margaret was the daughter of Albert III, Duke of Bavaria and Anna of Brunswick-Grubenhagen-Einbeck. The marriage between Margaret and Federico helped trading relations between the two states.

Margaret was not able to speak or read Italian when she arrived, but the relationship with Federico was described as happy. The court was dominated by her mother-in-law, but Margaret avoided all conflicts.

During his war against Aragon, Federico appointed Margaret as regent in his absence during the spring and summer of 1479, during which she died.

== Issue ==
Margaret and Frederico had:

- Clara Gonzaga (1464–1503) married in 1482 to Gilbert of Bourbon-Montpensier Duke of Sessa parents of Charles III, Duke of Bourbon.
- Francesco II Gonzaga, Marquis of Mantua (1466–1519) married in 1490 to Isabella d'Este
- Sigismondo Gonzaga (1469–1525)
- Elisabetta Gonzaga (1471–1526) married in 1489 to Guidobaldo da Montefeltro Duke of Urbino
- Maddalena Gonzaga (1472–1490) married in 1489 to Giovanni Sforza Lord of Pesaro and Gradara
- Giovanni Gonzaga (1474–1525) married in 1493 Laura Bentivoglio (d.1523)

== Sources ==
- Antenhofer, Christina (2001). "From Local Signori to European High Nobility: The Gonzaga Family Networks in the Fifteenth Century". In Johnson, Christopher H.; Sabean, David Warren; Teuscher, Simon; Trivellato, Francesca (eds.). Transregional and Transnational Families in Europe and Beyond: Experiences. Berghahn books.
- James, Carolyn (2020). A Renaissance Marriage: The Political and Personal Alliance of Isabella d'Este & Francesco Gonzaga, 1490-1519. Oxford University Press.
- Jansen, S. (2008). Debating Women, Politics, and Power in Early Modern Europe. Palgrave Macmillan.

Preceded by Barbara of Brandenburg	Marchesa of Mantua; 1478-1479	Succeeded by Isabella d'Este
