= Francesco d'Antonio Zacchi =

Italian painter

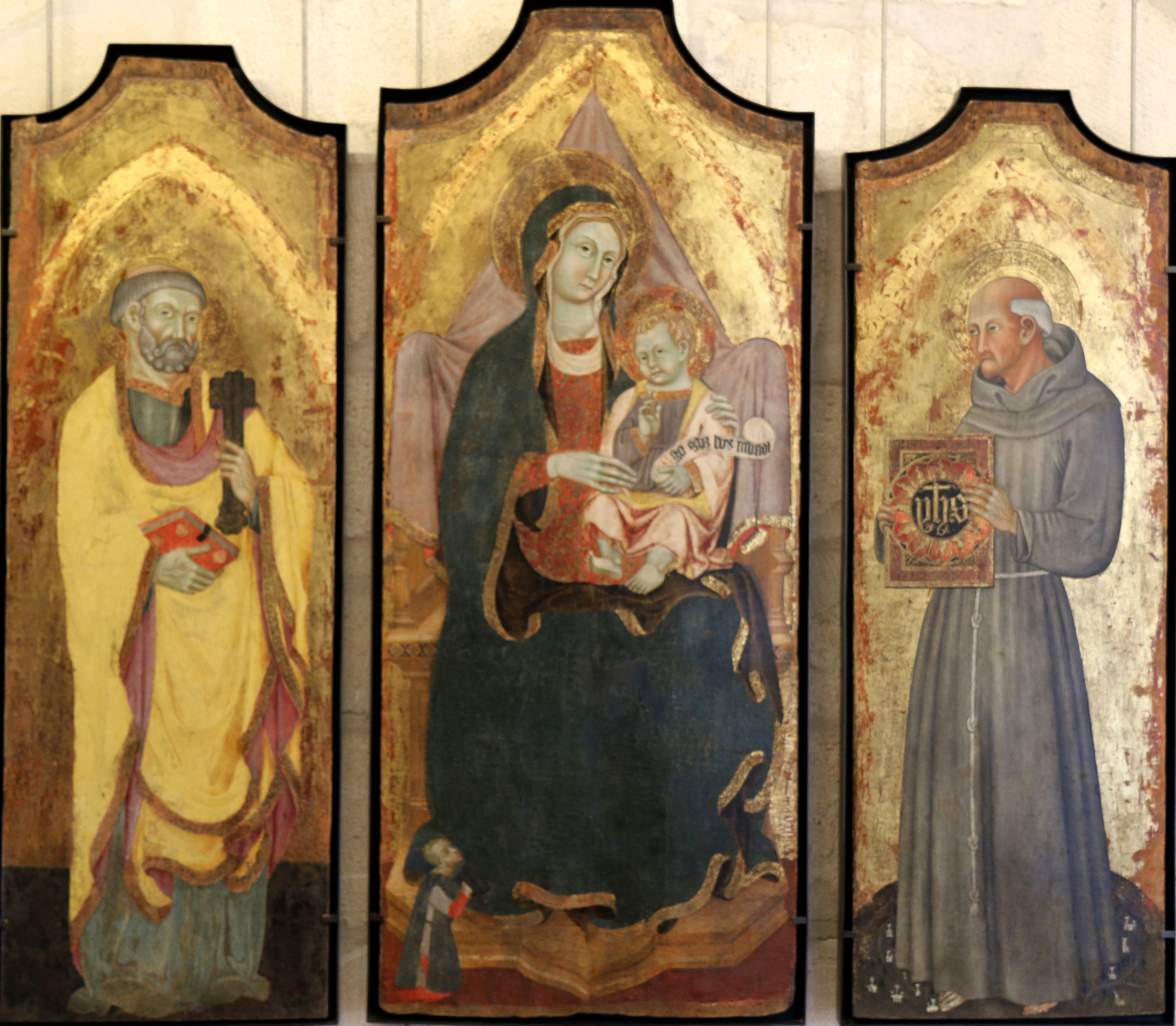
Triptych depicting the Virgin and Child, Saint Peter and Saint Bernardin de Sienne Musée du Petit Palais, Avignon

Francesco d’Antonio Zacchi, also known as il Balletta (c. 1407 – before 1476), was an Italian painter of the late-Gothic and early-Renaissance style active in Viterbo, region of Lazio, Italy. He is also called Francesco d'Antonio da Viterbo.

== Biography ==
Documents have him working from 1430-1467 near Piazza Santa Maria Nuova in Viterbo, a church which houses a fresco of the Crucifixion with the Madonna and Saints John the Baptist, Ambrosius, and others.

Other details of his life are poorly documented, his style shows the influence of the Sienese Bartolo di Fredi and Taddeo di Bartolo.

Among his works are a polyptych, depicting the Enthroned Madonna and Child with Saints (1441) painted for San Giovanni in Zoccoli in Viterbo. Another polyptych depicts the Virgin and child enthroned with Saints Rose and Catherine of Alexandria painted for the Sanctuary of Santa Rosa. In 1464, he was commissioned to gild and paint the coat of arms of Pope Calixtus III for the Castle of Viterbo. A fresco of the Virgin is found in the church of San Biagio, Tuscania.
