= Santa Maria Nuova, Viterbo =

Church in Lazio, Italy

Coordinates: 42.4154°N 12.1047°E

Santa Maria Nuova is an Romanesque-style, Roman Catholic church located on Via Baciadonne and the piazza of the same name in the historic center of Viterbo in the Region of Lazio, Italy.

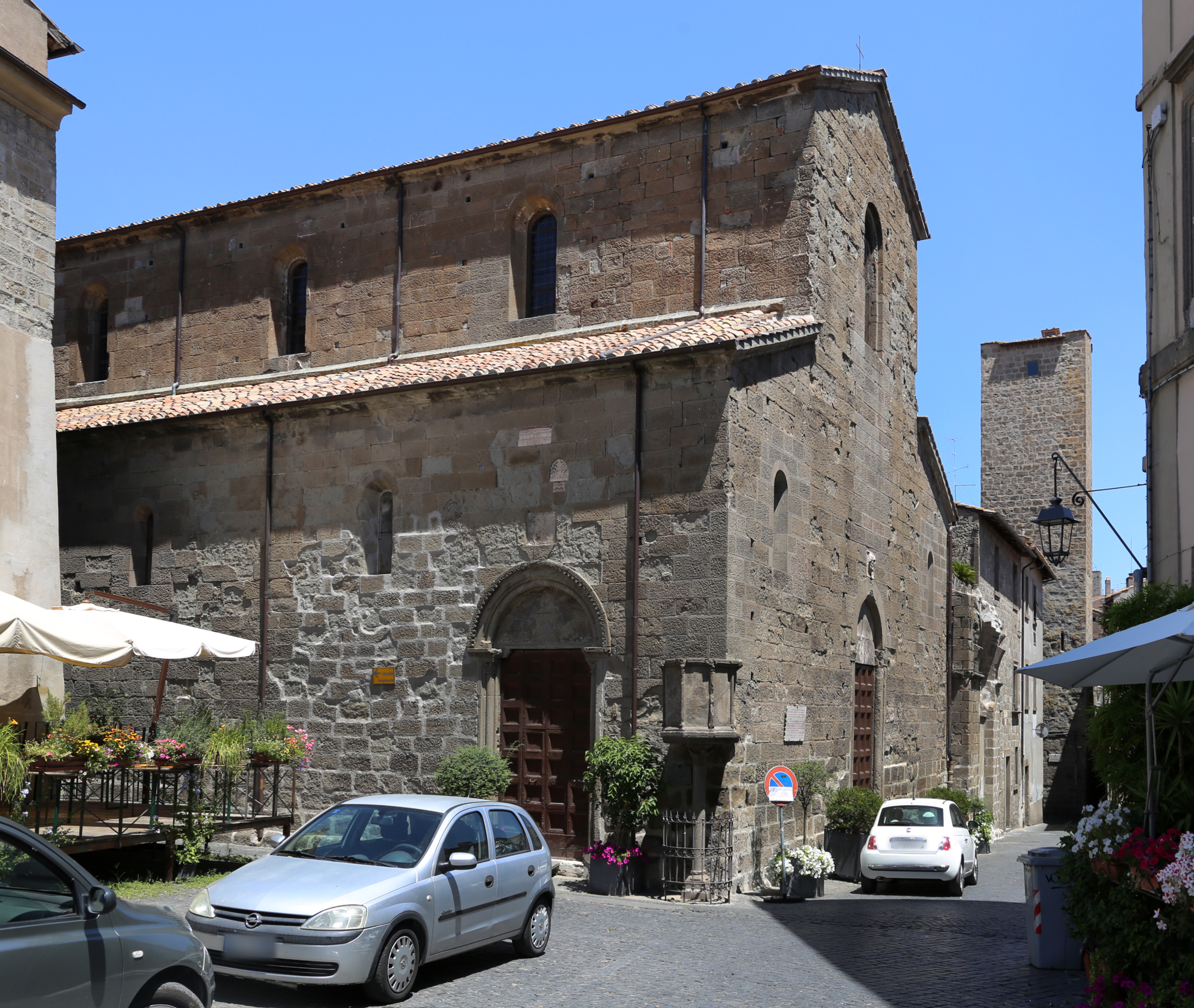
Facade and western flank; exterior pulpit at corner of facade

== History ==
A church at the site existed prior to 1080 when documents note that the church, along with its adjacent hospital/hostel for pilgrims, was donated to the city of Viterbo by a family of a prete Biterbo. The temple was a parish church since 1217. Until 1574, the church was the archive, bank, and assembly hall for the popular assemblies. After that, these functions were moved to the Palazzo dei Priori.

The stone brick exterior facade is rough and rustic with a single portal with a rounded tympanum; at the top is a triangular sail campanile. The facade is pierced by three monofora windows. Above the portal is a marble bust, likely spolia from an Ancient Roman structure. On the church's west flank, is a second entrance with a better preserved portal. Notable on the facade corner here is the stone pulpit atop a narrow column. It is claimed this pulpit was used to speak to the arengo, or assembly of citizens of the city. It is claimed that in 1266, Thomas Aquinas spoke from this pulpit to lobby for peace between Viterbo and Orvieto. On the wall various marble spolia decorate the wall.

The interior nave is divided by two rows, each of six columns, each with their individual Romanesque Corinthian capitals. The central nave and parallel aisles end in the apse with the typical Romanesque semicircles. The wall niche in the chapel of the Monaldeschi family was frescoed with a Crucifixion with the Madonna, Magdalen, St John, and St James Major (1340s) by Matteo Giovannetti. In 1459, in this chapel was interred Alessio Tignosini who had been decapitated in the Piazza del Plebiscito for starting a revolt against the Gatti family.

Other altars house frescoes by Francesco d’Antonio Zacchi, also called il Balletta, including a Resurrected Christ and a Enthroned Madonna and Child with St John the Baptist and Donor. The church houses a frescoed Saints Jerome, John the Baptist, and Lawrence (1490)by Antonio Del Massaro, also called il Pastura. The church also houses a 13th-century Triptych of San Salvatore, as well as modern works. It houses a fresco depicting the Virgin and Child with Saints Bartholemew and Lawrence (circa 1510) attributed to Giovanni Francesco d’Avanzarano. In the presbytery is a modern bronze plaque depicting The Last Supper (1964) by Carlo Canestrari. Remnants of a Romanesque cloister, on the eastern flank adjacent to the church date from the Lombard era.

== Gallery ==
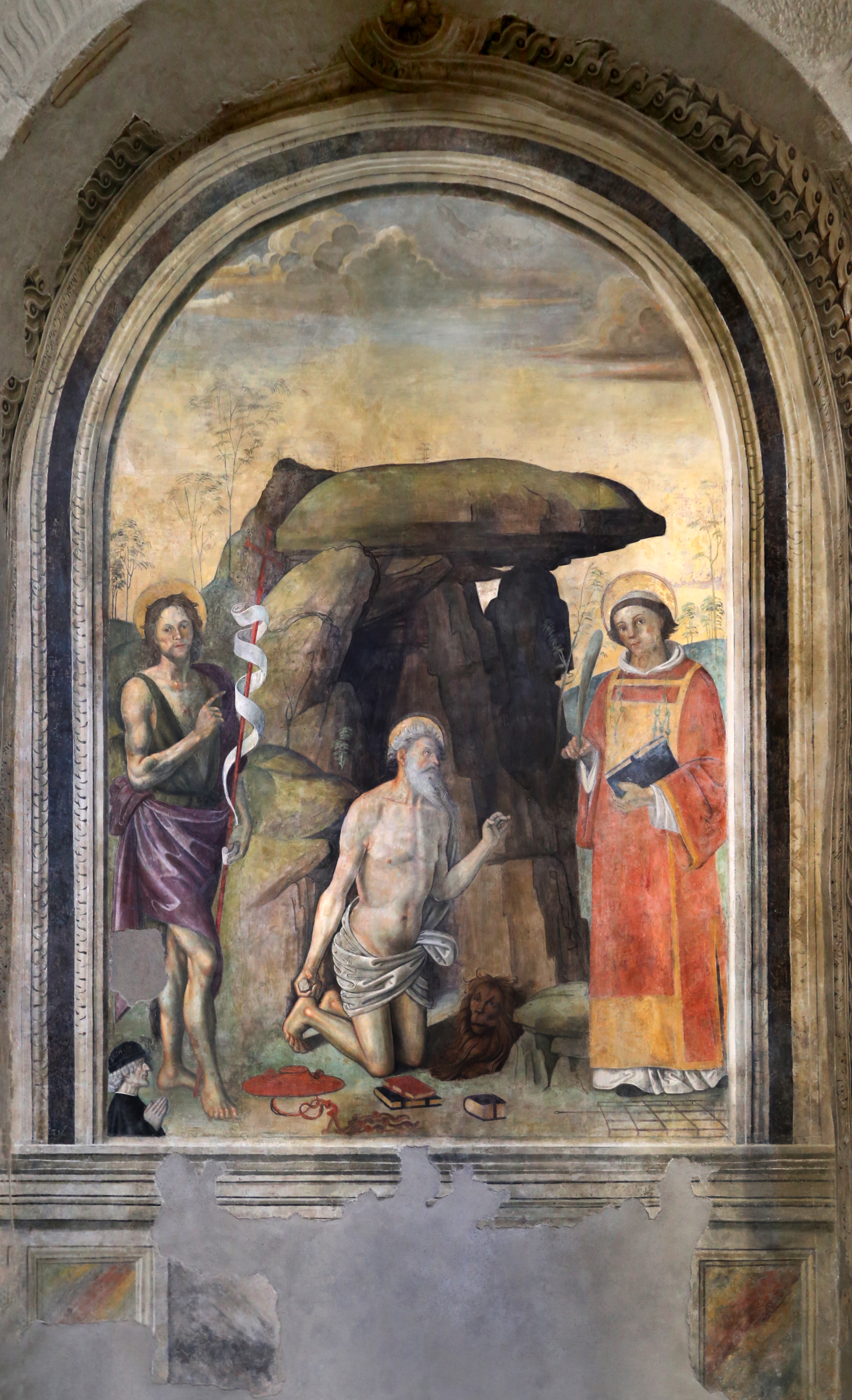
Altar fresco by Antonio del Massaro

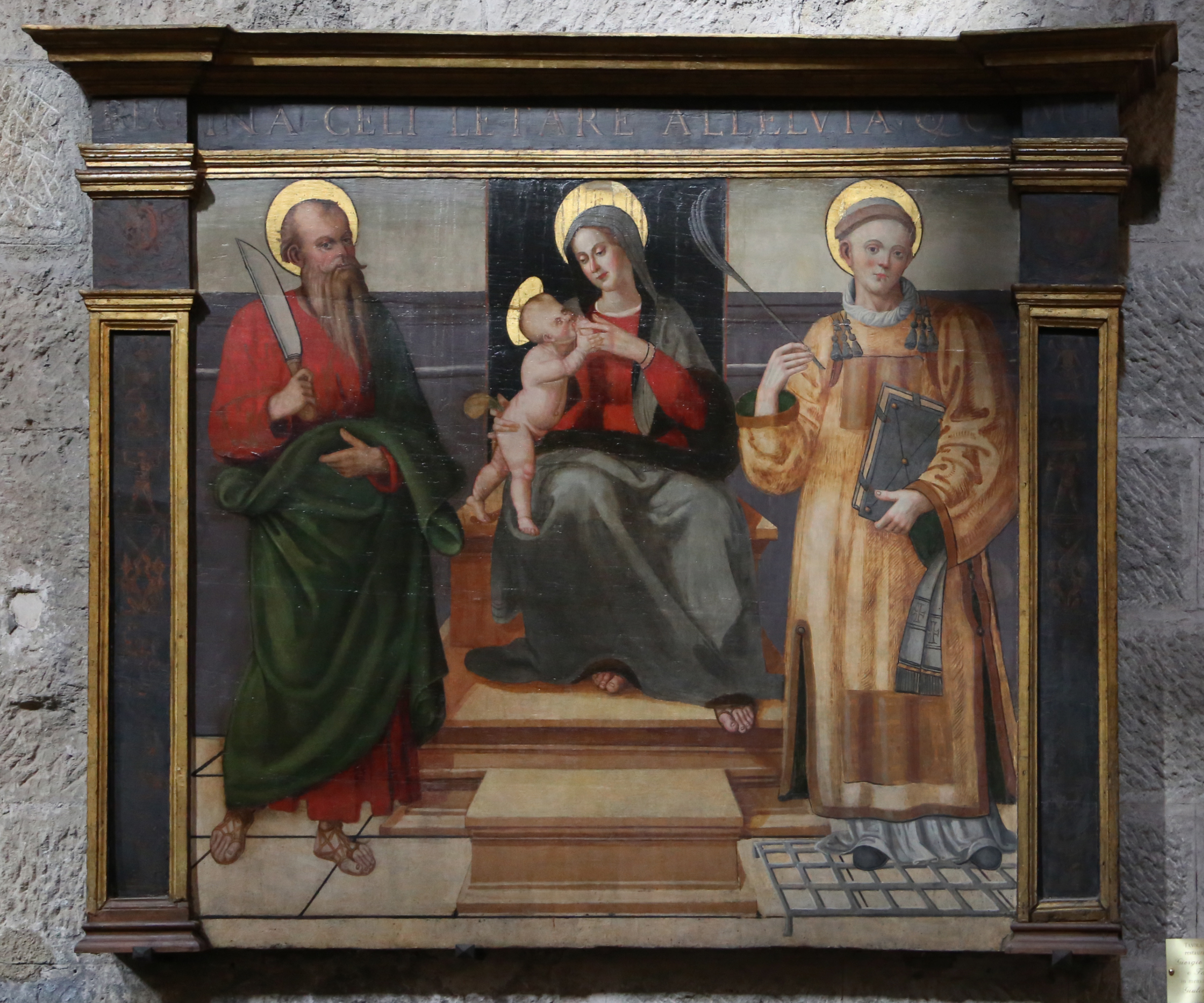
Altar fresco by d'Avanzarano

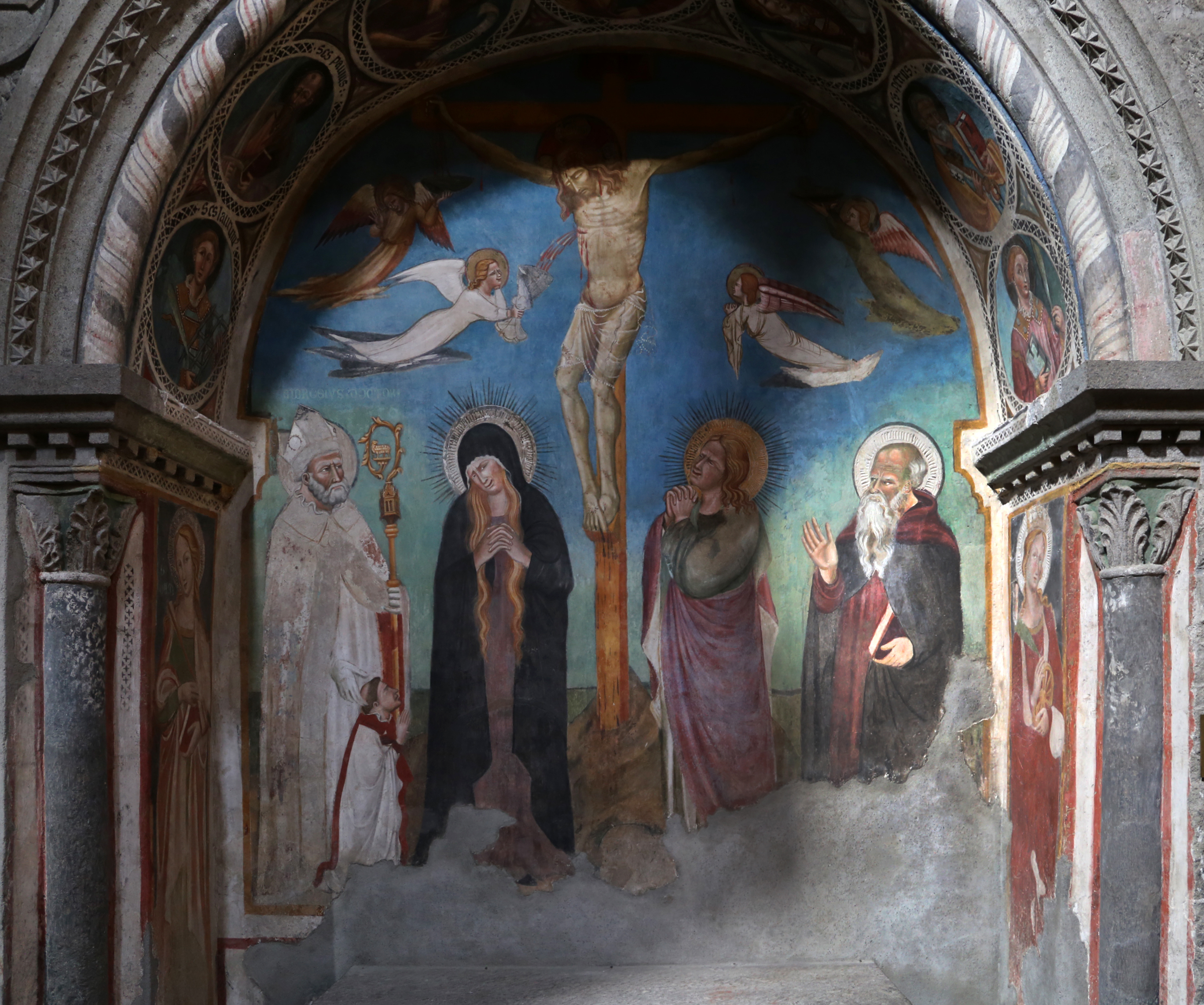
Crucifixion with Saints by Francesco Zacchi

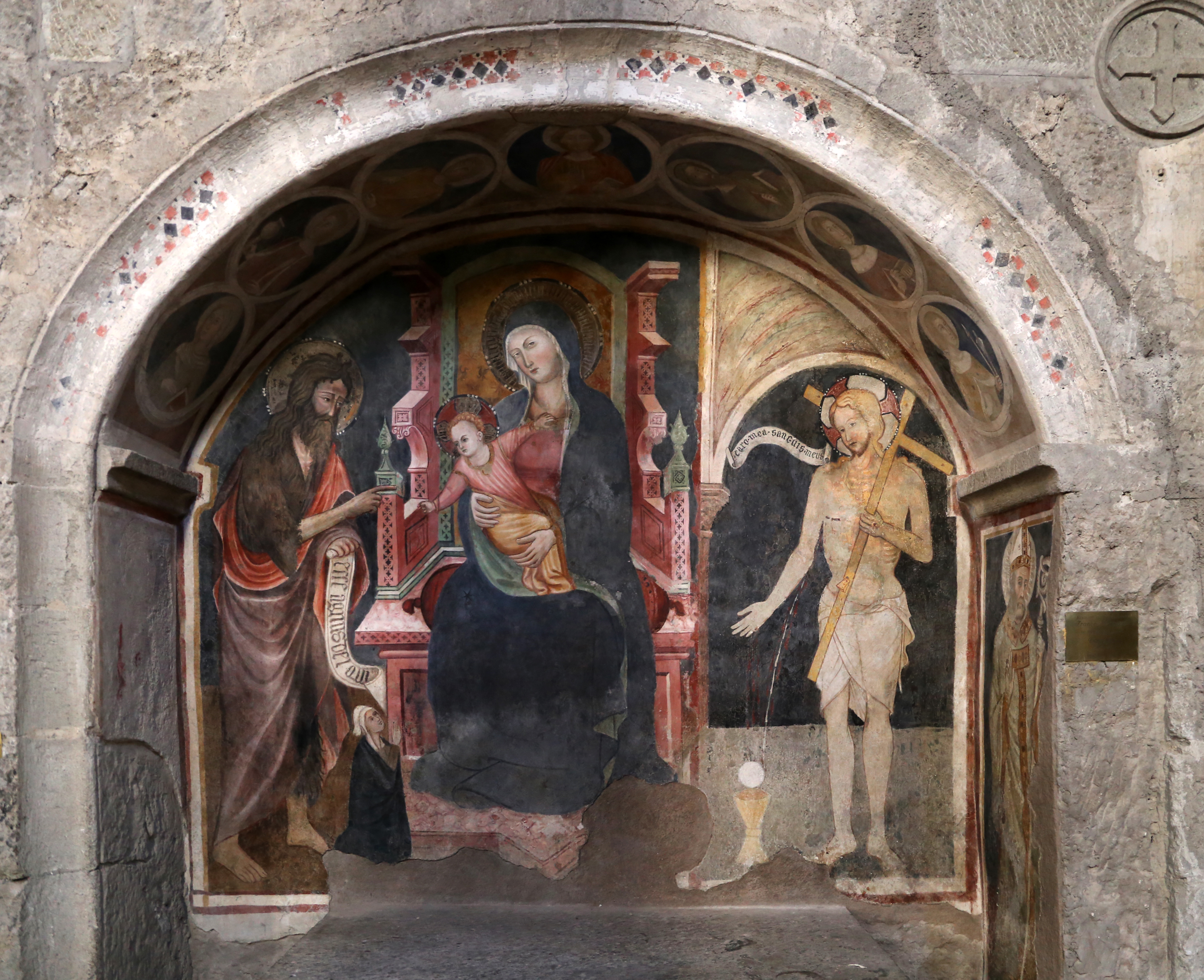
Enthroned Madonna and Child with St John the Baptist and Donor by Zacchi

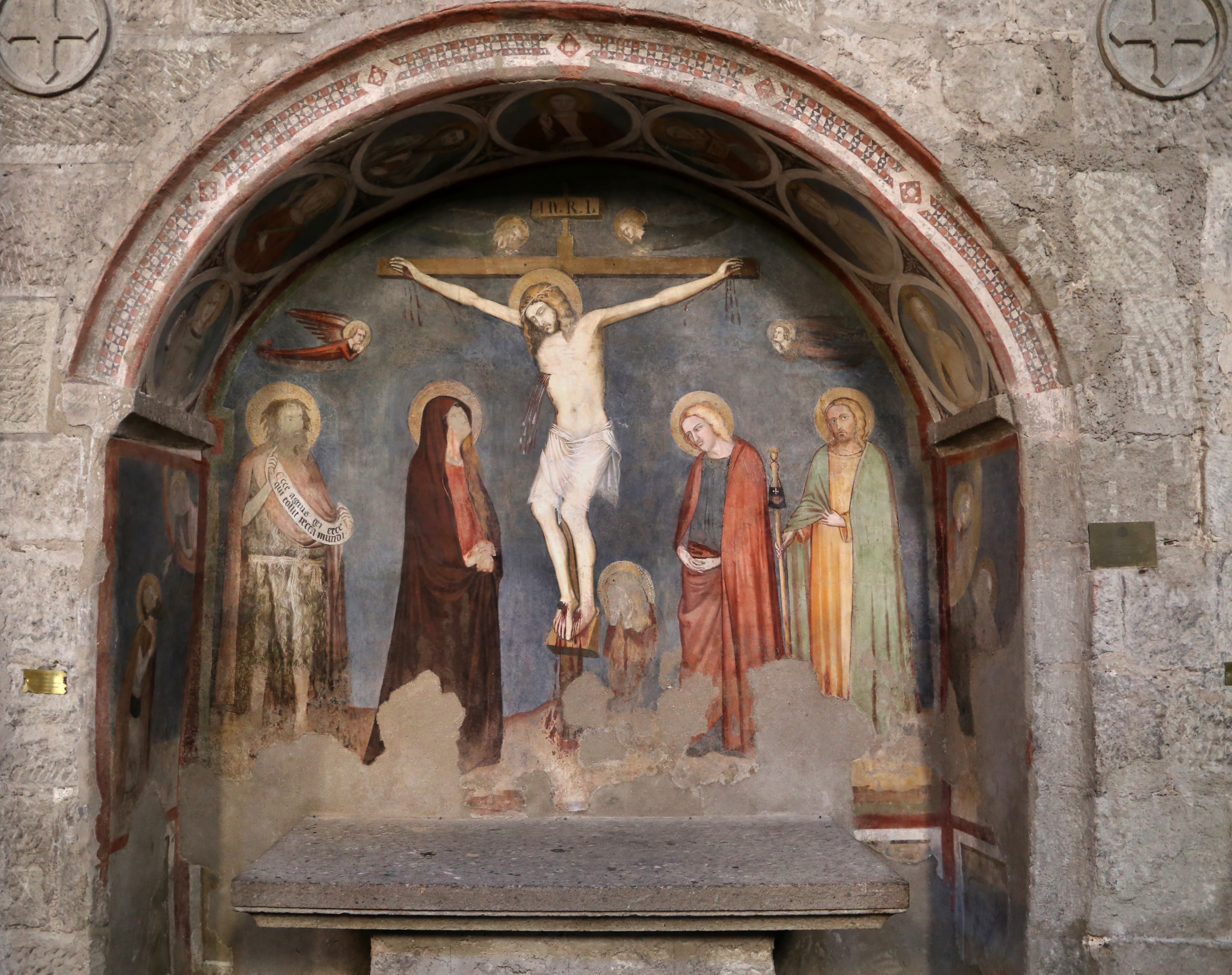
Crucifixion and Saints (1340) by Matteo Giovannetti
