= Federico I Gonzaga of Mantua =

Marquis of Mantue

Federico I Gonzaga
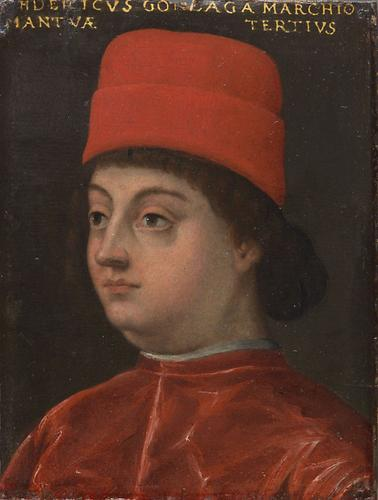
- Portrait of Federico I Gonzaga at the Uffizi in Florence
- Born: 25 June 1441; Mantua, Margravate of Mantua
- Died: 14 July 1484 (aged 43); Mantua, Margravate of Mantua
- Noble family: House of Gonzaga
- Spouse: Margaret of Bavaria
- Issue: Clara Gonzaga; Francesco II Gonzaga; Sigismondo Gonzaga; Elisabetta Gonzaga; Maddelena; Giovanni Gonzaga
- Father: Ludovico III Gonzaga
- Mother: Barbara of Brandenburg

Federico I Gonzaga (25 June 1441 – 14 July 1484) was marquis of Mantua from 1478 to 1484, as well as a condottiero.

== Biography ==
Federico was born in Mantua in 1441, son of Ludovico III and Barbara of Brandenburg. He was a good friend of the court painter Andrea Mantegna and received an education from Mantegna's mother as well as from Vittorino da Feltre (d. 1446) and above all from Iacopo da San Cassiano (from 1446 to 1449) and Ognibene da Lonigo (from 1449).

Federico fought for the Sforza of Milan until 1470 and succeeded to the marquisate on 14 June 1478. He was, however, forced to split much of the Mantuan possessions with his brothers.

Federico continued to fight as a condottiero, and during his frequent absences Mantua was administered by Eusebio Malatesta, while the local army was under his brother-in-law, Francesco Secco d'Aragona. Federico took part in numerous actions in defence of the Duchy of Milan, in particular against the aggressive Republic of Venice. During one of these wars Francesco Secco occupied Asola and other Venetian territories. Later, after the peace, Ludovico Sforza of Milan asked for the return of Asola to Milan, to which Frederick had to acquiesce.

Federico died in Mantua at the age of 43, and was buried in the church of Sant'Andrea.

== Family ==
In 1463 Federico married Margaret of Bavaria, daughter of Albert III, Duke of Bavaria and Anna, Duchess of Brunswick-Grubenhagen. They had the following issue:

- Clara (1464–1503) married in 1482 to Gilbert of Bourbon-Montpensier Duke of Sessa
- Francesco II (1466–1519), Marquis of Mantua; married in 1490 to Isabella d'Este granddaughter of King Ferdinand I of Naples
- Sigismondo (1469–1525) Cardinal since 1505 and Bishop of Mantua since 1511
- Elisabetta (1471–1526) married in 1489 to Guidobaldo da Montefeltro Duke of Urbino
- Maddelena (1472–1490) married in 1489 to Giovanni Sforza Lord of Pesaro and Gradara
- Giovanni (1474–1525) married in 1493 Laura Bentivoglio (d. 1523) and had issue. His descendants, the Marquises of Vescovato, have been the senior line of the House of Gonzaga since the 18th century, after the extinction of the other senior lines

== See also ==
- Italian Wars

== Sources ==
- Bartlett, Kenneth R. (2013). A Short History of the Italian Renaissance. University of Toronto Press.
- Hickson, Sally Anne (2016). Women, Art and Architectural Patronage in Renaissance Mantua: Matrons, Mystics, and Monasteries. Routledge.
- James, Carolyn (2020). A Renaissance Marriage: The Political and Personal Alliance of Isabella D'Este and Francesco Gonzaga, 1490-1519. Oxford University Press.
- Jansen, S. (2008). Debating Women, Politics, and Power in Early Modern Europe. Palgrave Macmillan.
- Kraye, Jill, ed. (1997). Cambridge Translations of Renaissance Philosophical Texts. Vol. 2: Political Philosophy. Cambridge University Press.

Federico I Gonzaga of Mantua House of Gonzaga Born: 25 June 1441 Died: 14 July 1484
Preceded by Ludovico III	Marquis of Mantua; 1478–1484	Succeeded by Francesco II
