= Sigismondo Gonzaga =

Italian cardinal (1469–1525)

His Eminence Sigismondo Gonzaga
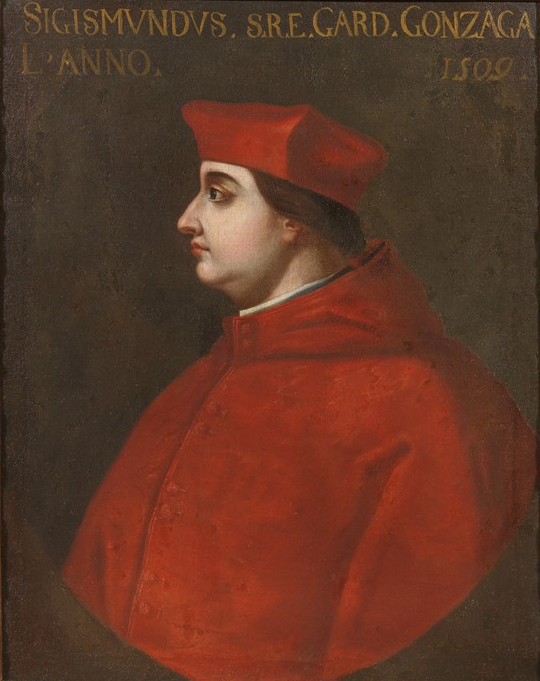
- Portrait by an unknown artist, c. 1509
- Church: Roman Catholic
- Other posts: Apostolic protonotary, apostolic legate, administrator of the Diocese of Aversa

Orders
- Created cardinal: 1 December 1505 by Pope Julius II

Personal details
- Born: 1469 Mantua
- Died: October 3, 1525 Mantua
- Denomination: Roman Catholic

Sigismondo Gonzaga (1469, Mantua – 3 October 1525, Mantua) was an Italian cardinal. He was the third son of Federico I Gonzaga, Marquess of Mantua.

== Life ==
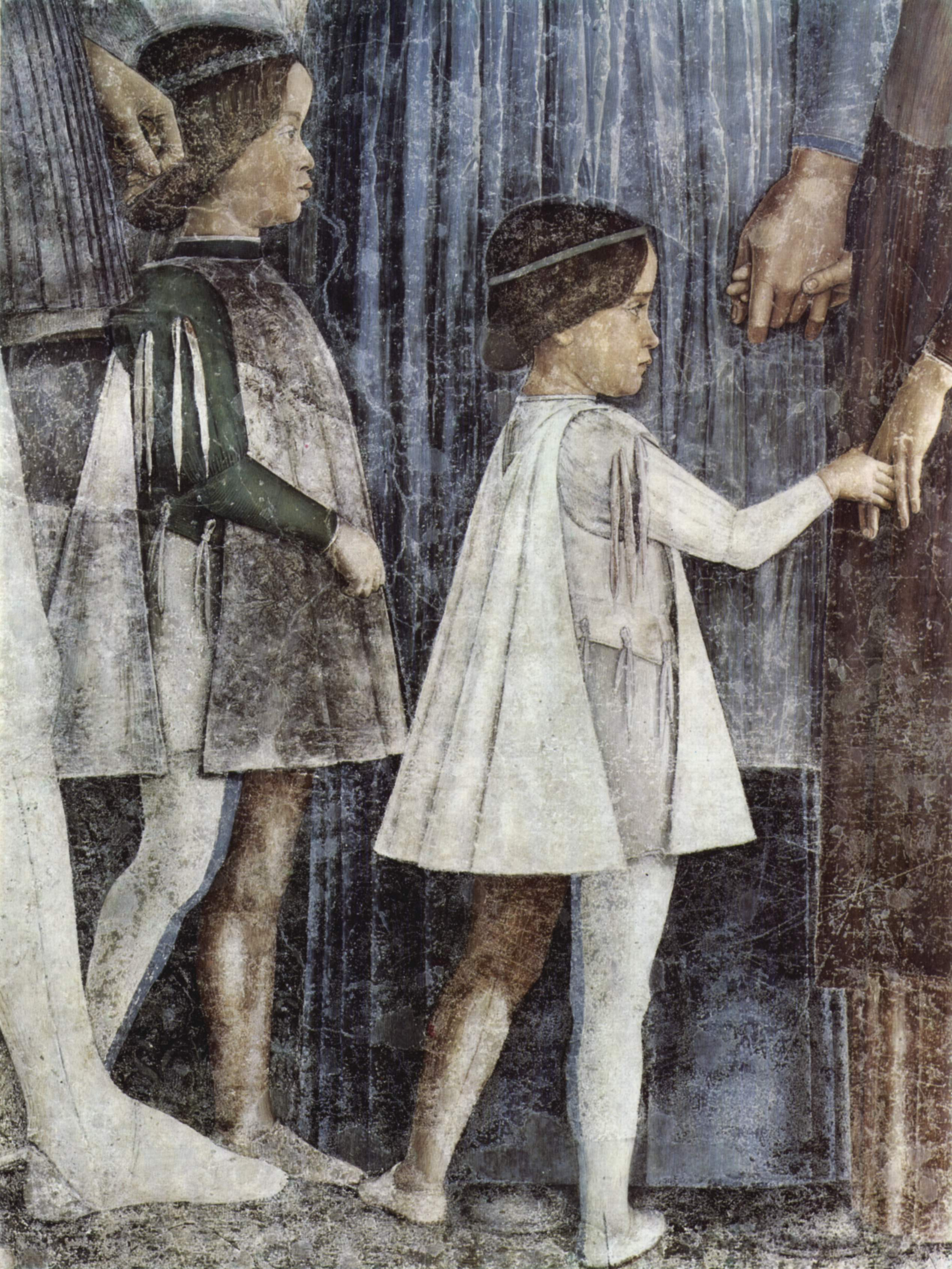
Sigismondo (right) and his brother Francesco in a detail from a fresco by Andrea Mantegna in the ducal palace in Mantua.

He was the son of Frederick I of Mantua and commanded his brother Francesco II's troops before beginning his ecclesiastical career. He became apostolic protonotary. He was made a cardinal by Pope Julius II in the consistory of 1 December 1505. He was made apostolic administrator of Mantua from 1511 to 1521, finally resigning the post in favour of his nephew Ercole. He gained much sympathy from the schismatic cardinals but remained faithful to Julius II.

He became apostolic legate to Bologna in 1511 and 1512 and legate to the March of Ancona and Mantua. He took part in the 1513 conclave which elected pope Leo X, that of 1521-22 that elected pope Hadrian VI and that of 1523 that elected pope Clement VII. He ended his career as administrator of Aversa at the start of 1524. He was the great-uncle of cardinals Francesco Gonzaga (1561) and Giovanni Vincenzo Gonzaga (1578). Other cardinals in the family were Francesco Gonzaga (1461), Pirro Gonzaga (1527), Scipione Gonzaga (1587), Ferdinando Gonzaga (1607) and Vincenzo Gonzaga (1615).
