= Giovanni Gonzaga =

Italian nobleman

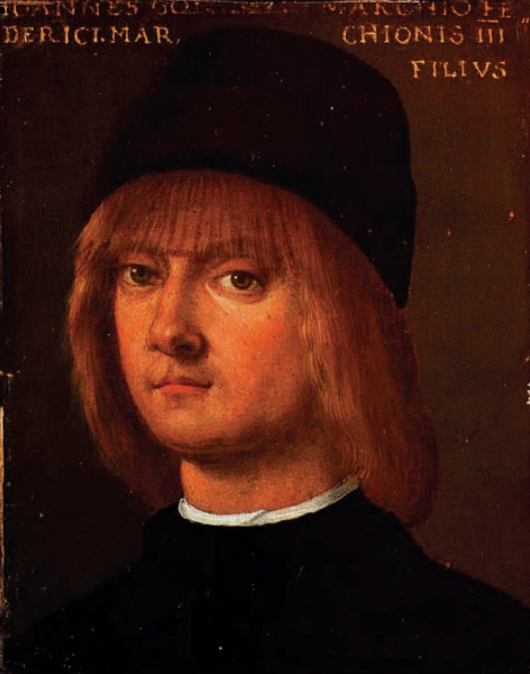
Portrait of Giovanni Gonzaga

Giovanni Gonzaga (1474 – 23 September 1525) was an Italian nobleman of the House of Gonzaga, born at Mantua.

Giovanni was the youngest child of Federico I Gonzaga, Marquess of Mantua and Margaret of Bavaria, Marchioness of Mantua. In 1494 he married Laura Bentivoglio, daughter of Giovanni II Bentivoglio, de facto lord of Bologna. As the lords of Vescovato, they started a branch of the Gonzaga family that survived until at least the 1990s.

== Sources ==
- James, Carolyn (2020). A Renaissance Marriage: The Political and Personal Alliance of Isabella d'Este & Francesco Gonzaga, 1490-1519. Oxford University Press.
