= Francesco II Gonzaga of Mantua =

Ruler of the Italian city of Mantua (1466–1519)

Francesco II Gonzaga
- Marquis of Mantua
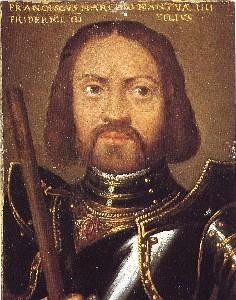
- Portrait of Francesco II Gonzaga in the Uffizi, Florence
- Reign: 1484–1519
- Predecessor: Federico I Gonzaga
- Successor: Federico II, Duke of Mantua
- Born: August 10, 1466; Mantua, Margravate of Mantua
- Died: March 29, 1519 (aged 52); Mantua, Margravate of Mantua
- Noble family: Gonzaga
- Spouse: Isabella d'Este (m. 1492)
- Issue: Eleonor Gonzaga; Ippolita Gonzaga; Federico II, Duke of Mantua; Ercole Gonzaga; Ferrante Gonzaga
- Father: Federico I Gonzaga
- Mother: Margaret of Bavaria

Francesco II Gonzaga (10 August 1466 – 29 March 1519) was Marquis of Mantua from 1484 until his death. A prominent condottiero and statesman during the Italian Wars, he commanded the Italian league forces at the Battle of Fornovo in 1495. Through his marriage to Isabella d'Este, one of the leading women of the Italian Renaissance, Francesco helped establish Mantua as a significant cultural and artistic center.

== Biography ==
Born in Mantua, Francesco was the son of Marquis Federico I Gonzaga and Margaret of Bavaria. In 1480 he was betrothed to Isabella d'Este, daughter of Ercole I d'Este and Eleonora of Aragon. In the hopes of fostering a strong relationship between Francesco and Isabella before their marriage, Francesco made several visits to the Este court in Ferrara in June 1480, January, February, and November 1481, January 1482. During these visits, Francesco and Isabella’s father, Ercole I d'Este, would build a positive relationship, with multiple Ferrarese chronicles highlighting Ercole’s mentoring of Francesco. Isabella arrived in Mantua in 1490 as his bride.

Francesco was the commander-in-chief of the army of the Italian league in the battle of Fornovo, under the tutorage of his more experienced uncle Ridolfo Gonzaga. Francesco was unable to stop Charles VIII and his army from returning to France, although he claimed the battle as a victory. He commissioned Andrea Mantegna’s Madonna della Vittoria to honor his self-proclaimed victory at Fornovo. Instead, a shrine in Mantua devoted to the Madonna of Victory with a detailed altarpiece, the Madonna della Vittoria, was completed for the one-year anniversary of the Battle of Fornovo and now stands in the Louvre.

Francesco briefly commanded the Venetian army, but in 1502 he left to pay his respects to Louis XII who was then at Milan. By 29 April, he was with Louis XII when Genoa fell to the French army. Francesco, taking the initiative after the French victory at Agnadello, was occupying lands that he had lost to Venice. He was marching to Legnano with a company of French lances, when he was captured by the Venetians. Francesco only gained his freedom by giving his son Federico II as hostage. Once free, he was placed in command of papal troops, although he was ineffective since he stayed in Mantua. By 17 February 1510, Francesco, no longer involved in the war, allowed a French army under Gaston of Foix to march through his territory to reach Brescia.

During Francesco's absences, Mantua was governed by his wife Isabella d'Este, whom he had married on 12 February 1490. Letters between Francesco and Isabella also demonstrate that the two worked collaboratively toward shared political goals. Under their reign, Mantua knew a great age of cultural splendour, with the presence in the city of artists such as Andrea Mantegna and Jacopo Bonacolsi. Francesco had the Palace of St. Sebastian built, where Mantegna's Triumph of Caesar was eventually placed. While maps often served for use in wars, Francesco enjoyed displaying them in the Palace of St. Sebastian. His palace contained a map of the world (mappamundi) and a map of Italy. Additionally, views of Cairo and Jerusalem were also present in the palace. He continued to collect maps until the end of his reign for his own enjoyment. The Palace was where Francesco lived when in Mantua. His wife, Isabella d'Este remained at the Castello di San Giorgio where she had her own suite of rooms. On completing the decoration of his rooms at the palace, Francesco asked his wife for her views. Isabella commented favourably, though she did say that the decorations were almost as good as those within her studiolo.

On 29 March 1519, Francesco, who had suffered from syphilis, died. He was succeeded by his son Federico, with Isabella acting as regent. Another son, Ferrante Gonzaga originated the branch of the Counts of Guastalla.

== Relationship with the Ottoman Empire ==
Francesco fostered a close relationship and promoted dialogue with the Ottomans. Francesco's relationship with them was mainly centered around receiving horses from the Ottomans, in exchange for rich and expensive fabrics. Francesco asked Giorgio Brognolo, his agent in Venice, to have a turban commissioned for him in 1492. Reasons for this commission are debated, with some theories suggesting socio-political or personal reasons. It is also presumed that he learned the Turkish language in addition to commissioning murals of maps as well, which included a mural called Camera de le Citate or the Room of Cities, which depicted Turkish people in Constantinople.

== Romantic and sexual relationships ==
Francesco was known for his passion for women, so much so that, on the occasion of the siege of Novara in 1495, his sister-in-law Beatrice d'Este, wanting to ingratiate herself with him, offered to personally procure him a prostitute ("femmina di partito") with whom to celebrate the victory, under the pretext of protecting both him and his wife from syphilis (the "malfrancese" or French disease).

Beginning in 1503, he started a long relationship with Lucrezia Borgia, including using coded letters. A close associate of Francesco, Ercole Strozzi, passed these letters. The letters used code names. Lucrezia was called Barbara, while Francesco was called Guido. The letters discussed the feelings the two had for one another. Some historians claim that Lucrezia and Francesco were engaged in a sexual relationship, often based on a story describing a three-day affair between the two. However, there are reports, letters, and travel schedules written during the supposed time of the affair that contradict the timing of such a meeting, indicating its occurrence is unlikely.

Francis also actively practiced sodomy, according to the ancient Greek custom, very widespread almost everywhere at that time, as he himself proudly claims in his poisonous letter of accusations to Galeazzo Sanseverino, dated 1503: "I am reputed and raised by nobility of birth and good morals; you for human and ass favors (and I usually have a party at the door of others, and not at mine!)".

It is well known that he surrounded himself with ruffians and mezzani, who had the task of procuring for him girls and young ephebes. One of these was, among others, Ludovico Camposampiero, who therefore ran into the hatred of the Marquise.

== Horsemanship ==
Francesco's family dynasty, the Gonzaga of Mantua, was known for breeding horses and competitors for racing. Additionally, in order to maintain their noble status, they used horsemanship. For instance, Francesco alleged that he succeeded in winning races with qualities of both merit and strength, and implied that since he possessed these qualities, he was greater than others.

== Family ==
Francesco and Isabella had:

1. Eleonora Gonzaga, born 1493, died 1570. Married Francesco Maria I della Rovere Duke of Urbino
2. Margherita, born 1496.
3. Livia, born 1501, died 1508.
4. Ippolita Gonzaga, born 1503, died 1570. Ippolita became a nun in the Dominican convent of S. Vincenzo.
5. Federico II, Duke of Mantua, born 1500, died 1540. First betrothed to Maria Palaeologina but later married her sister Margaret Palaeologina
6. Ercole Gonzaga, born 1506, died 1565. Became a Cardinal.
7. Ferrante Gonzaga, born 1507, died 1557. Married Isabella di Capua.
8. Livia, later known as Sister Paola, born 1508, died 1569

== See also ==
- Rulers of Mantua
- Condottieri
- Italian Wars

== Sources ==
- Bartlett, Kenneth R. (2013). A Short History of the Italian Renaissance. University of Toronto Press. ISBN 978-1442600140.
- Boltanski, Ariane (2006). Les Ducs de Nevers et L'etat Royal (in French). Librairie Droz S.A.
- Bourne, Molly (1999). "Francesco II Gonzaga and Maps as Palace Decoration in Renaissance Mantua". Imago Mundi, Ltd. 51 (1): 51–82.
- Bourne, Molly (2010). "The Art of Diplomacy: Mantua and the Gonzaga, 1328-1630". In Rosenberg, Charles M. (ed.). The Court Cities of Northern Italy: Milan, Parma, Piacenza, Mantua, Ferrara, Bologna, Urbino, Pesaro, and Rimini. Cambridge University Press. pp. 138–195. ISBN 978-0-521-79248-6.
- Bourne, Molly (2011). "The Turban'd Turk in Renaissance Mantua: Francesco II Gonzaga's Interest in Ottoman Fashion". In Jackson, Philippa; Rebecchini, Guido (eds.). Mantova e il Rinascimento italiano. Studi in onore di David S. Chambers. Sometti Editoriale. pp. 53–64. ISBN 978-88-7495-405-6.
- Brown, Beverly Louise (2011). "Portraiture at the Courts of Italy". In Christiansen, Keith; Weppelmann, Stefan (eds.). The Renaissance Portrait: From Donatello to Bellini. Metropolitan Museum of Art. pp. 26–48. ISBN 9781588394255.
- Cashman III, Anthony B. (Summer 2002). "Performance Anxiety: Federico Gonzaga at the Court of Francis I and the Uncertainty of Ritual Action". The Sixteenth Century Journal. 33 (2).
- Cockram, Sarah D.P. (2016). Isabella D'Este and Francesco Gonzaga: Power Sharing at the Italian Renaissance Court. Routledge. ISBN 9781317112723.
- Dalton, Heather (2014). "A Sulphur-crested Cockatoo in fifteenth-century Mantua: rethinking symbols of sanctity and patterns of trade". Renaissance Studies. 28 (5 (November)): 676–694. doi:10.1111/rest.12042. JSTOR 24423450.
- Ferino, Sylvia (1994). Isabella d'ESte. KHM Vienna.
- Hickson, Sally Anne (2016). Women, Art and Architectural Patronage in Renaissance Mantua: Matrons, Mystics, and Monasteries. Routledge.
- Jaser, Christian (2020). "Racehorses and the Competitive Representation of Italian Renaissance Courts: Infrastructure, Media, and Centaurs". In Weber, N.; Hengerer, M. (eds.). Animals & Courts. Europe, c. 1200-1800. Walter de Gruyter Gmbh. pp. 175–194. ISBN 978-3-11-054256-1.
- Luzio, Alessandro; Renier, Rodolfo (1890). Delle relazioni d'Isabella d'Este Gonzaga con Lodovico e Beatrice Sforza. Milano: Tipografia Bortolotti di Giuseppe Prato.
- Mallett, Michael; Shaw, Christine (2012). The Italian Wars 1494–1559. Pearson.
- Nicolle, David (1996). Fornovo 1495: France's Bloody Fighting Retreat. Osprey Publishing. ISBN 1-85532-522-5.
- Roeder, Ralph (1933). The Man of the Renaissance. Viking Press.

Francesco II Gonzaga of Mantua House of Gonzaga Born: 10 August 1466 Died: 29 March 1519
Preceded by Federico I	Marquis of Mantua; 1484–1519	Succeeded by Federico II
