= Fasti of the Gonzagas =

Painting by Tintoretto

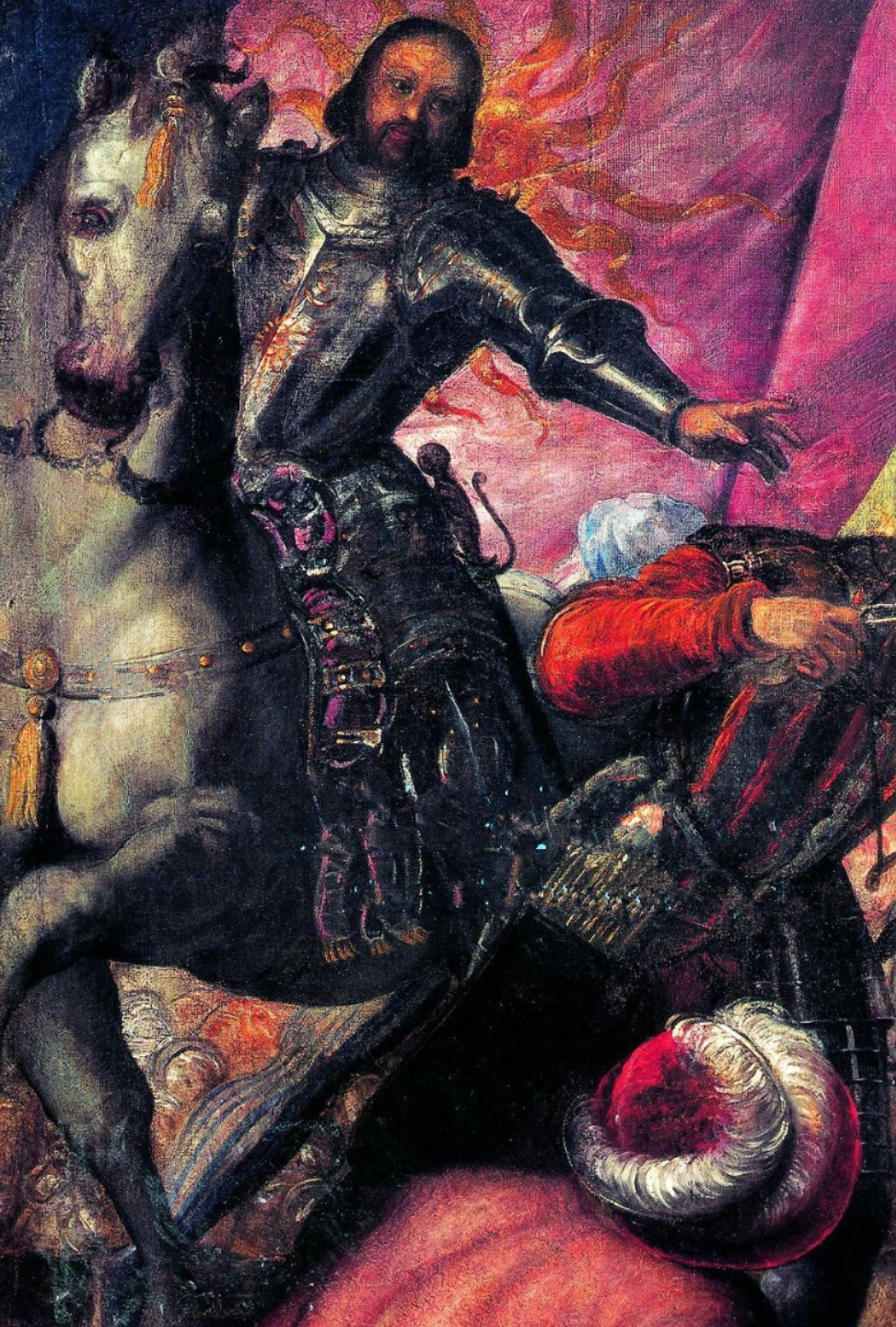
Detail of one of the works, showing Francesco II Gonzaga at the Battle of the Taro.

The Fasti of the Gonzagas (Fasti gonzagheschi) or Gonzaga Cycle is a 1578–1580 cycle of oil on canvas paintings commissioned from Tintoretto and his workshop by Guglielmo Gonzaga to hang in two of the new rooms he had added to the Palazzo Ducale in Mantua. They celebrate the history of the Gonzaga family, particularly its military triumphs in the 15th and 16th centuries, and remained in the city until being taken to Venice in the early 18th century by the tenth and final Gonzaga duke Ferdinando Carlo Gonzaga. There they were bought in 1708 by Maximilian II Emanuel, Elector of Bavaria for his collection in Munich, where they still hang in the Alte Pinakothek.

== History ==
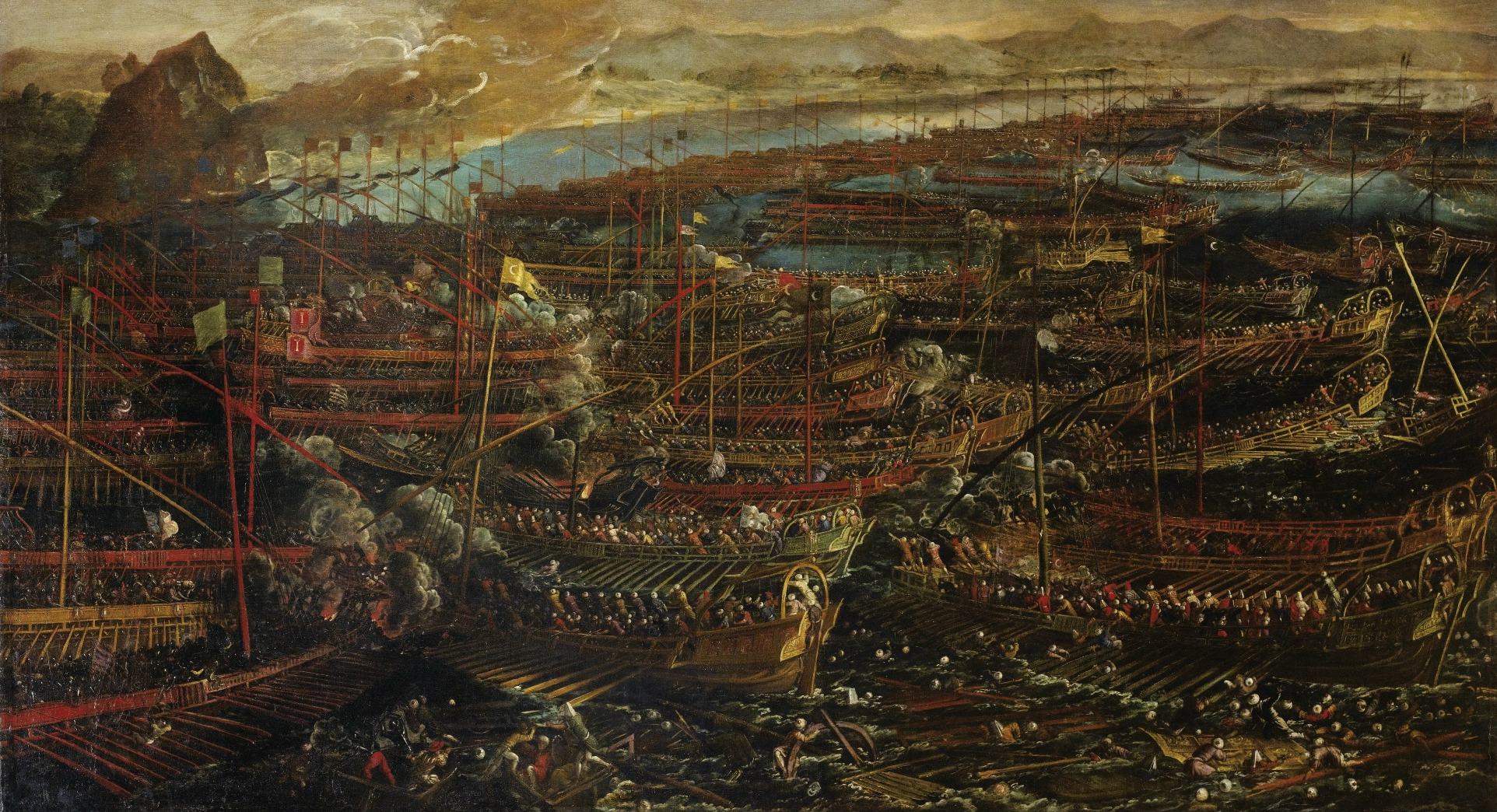
Tintoretto, Battle of Lepanto (1571; private collection) - a large oil sketch for the masterpiece lost in a fire at the Palazzo Ducale in Venice in 1577

The commission came in two halves, with four canvases ordered in 1578 for the Sala dei Marchesi, followed by another four for the Sala dei Duchi, and all eight completed by or in 1580. He had been commissioned to produce a Battle of Lepanto for the Palazzo Ducale in Venice in 1571, which was widely praised and whose reputation may have reached Mantua, a city which at that time kept a close eye on Venetian art trends. The commission may also have been influenced by a wish to compete with the Medici's battle paintings by Vasari at the Palazzo Vecchio and the cycle of battle paintings produced for the Palazzo Farnese at Caprarola by Taddeo Zuccari for the Farnese.

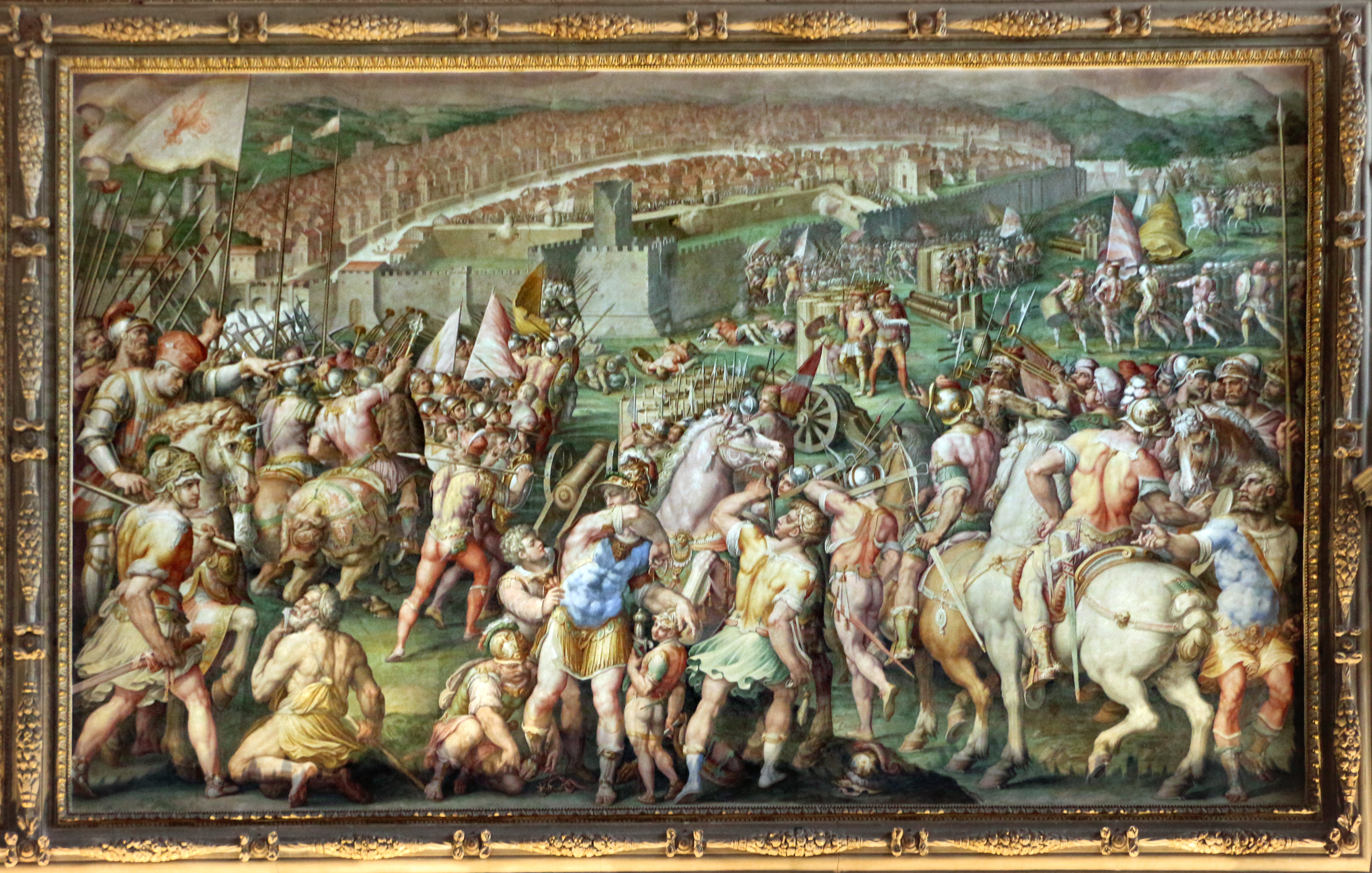
Giorgio Vasari and workshop, Capture of the Fortress of Stampace in Pisa, 1568-1571, Palazzo Vecchio, Florence.

The main source for the works is a set of letters between the major Mantuan court official count Teodoro Sangiorgio and the Gonzaga's ambassador to Venice Paolo Moro, in which Sangiorgio sent Moro Federico's detailed instructions on what the works to pass on to the artist himself. The letters also included depictions of the rooms in which the works were to hang and portraits of Federico and past Gonzaga marquesses and dukes for Tintoretto to copy into the works.

The sum received for the commission was relatively small considering the large size of the canvases, (Note: The canvases's measurements are - Giovanni Francesco Gonzaga made Marquess of Mantua: cm. 272.5 × 432; Ludovico II Gonzaga Defeats the Venetians at the Battle of Adigesconfigge i veneziani nella battaglia dell'Adige: cm. 273 × 385.5; Federico I Gonzaga libera Legnano: cm. 262 × 421.5; Francesco II Gonzaga at the Battle of Taro: cm. 269.5 × 422; Federico II Gonzaga Conquers Parma: cm. 212 × 283.5; Federico II Gonzaga's Victorious Entry into Milan: cm. 212 × 283.5; Federico II Gonzaga Defends Padua: cm. 210 × 276.5; Philip II of Spain Enters Mantua: cm. 211.7 × 330.) their huge number of figures and the speed with which they were produced, all explaining the major contribution of Tintoretto's workshop, including his son Domenico. Tintoretto essentially confined himself to producing the final drawings for the compositions, leaving most of the actual painting to his assistants.

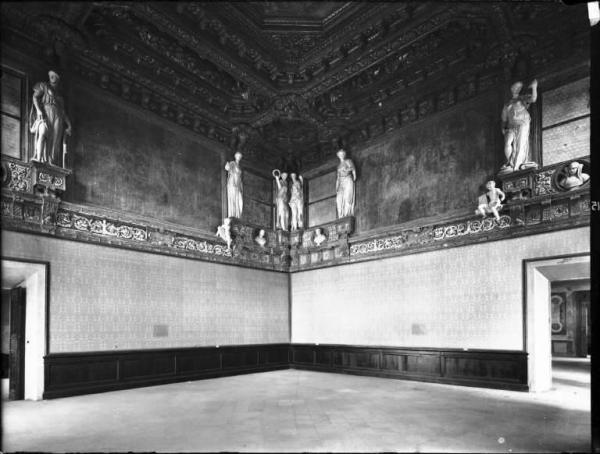
The Sala dei Marchesi, showing the gaps for Tintoretto's works between the stucco work by Francesco Segala

== Sala dei Marchesi ==
=== Sigismund Makes Giovanni Francesco Gonzaga Marquess of Mantua ===
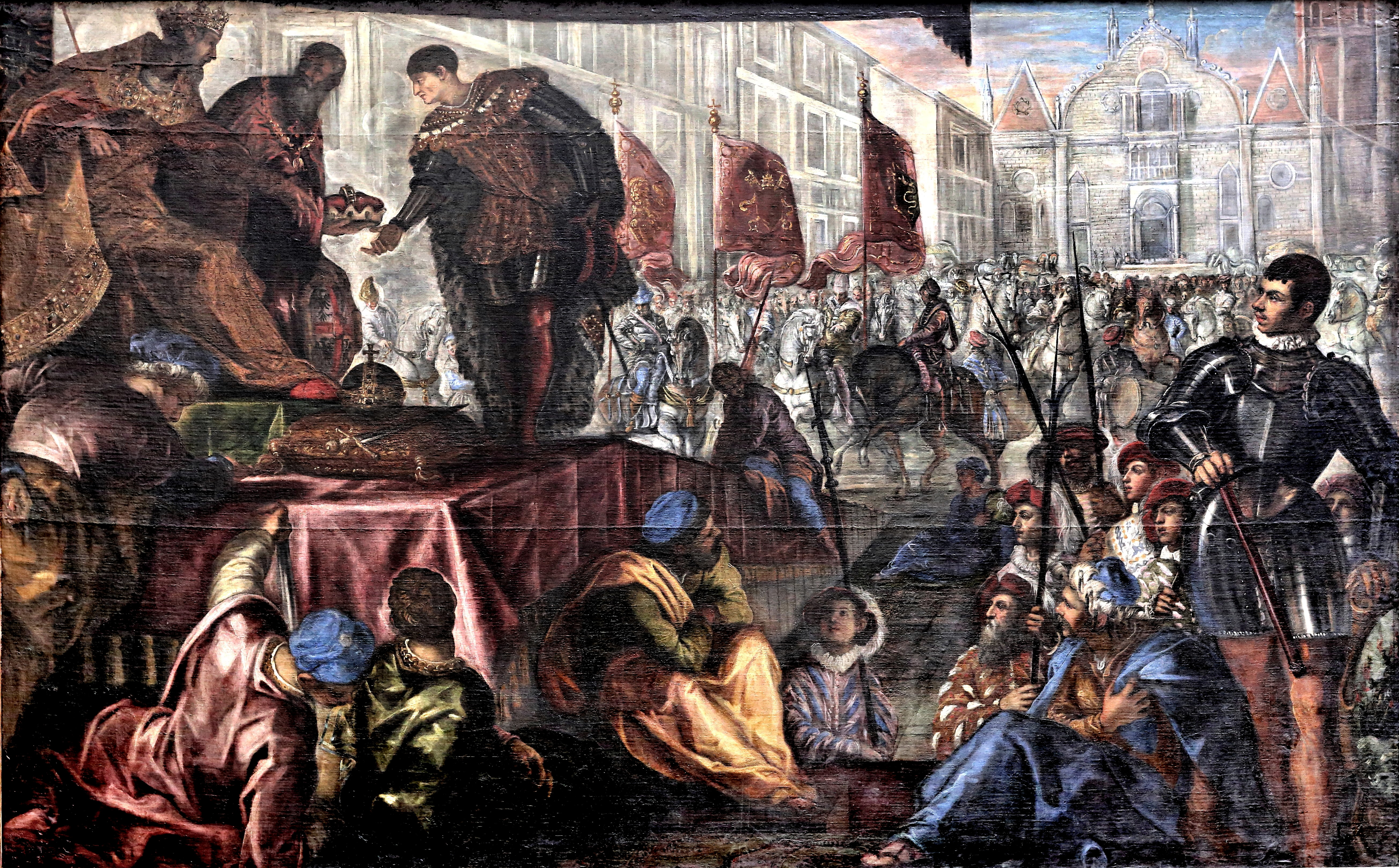
Sigismund Makes Giovanni Francesco Gonzaga Marquess of Mantua

The first canvas celebrates Sigismund of Luxembourg granting the title of marquess to Gianfrancesco Gonzaga, the first to hold that title, in Piazza San Pietro (now Piazza Sordello) in Mantua. Sigismund was then in Italy to be crowned Holy Roman Emperor by Pope Eugene IV.

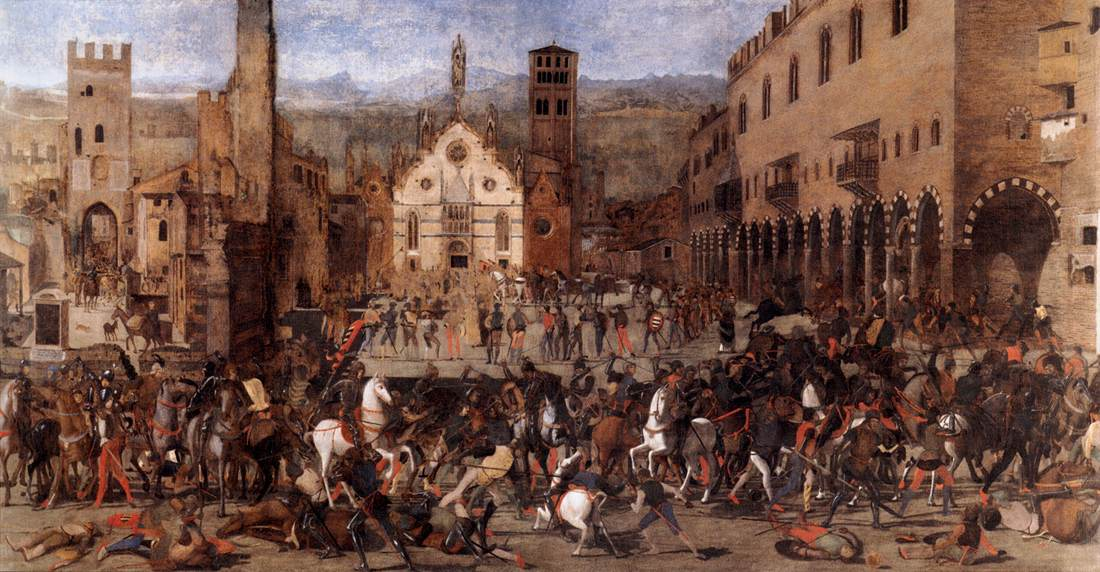
Domenico Morone, Cacciata dei Bonacolsi, 1494, Palazzo ducale, Mantua

=== Ludovico II Gonzaga Defeats the Venetians at the Battle of Adige ===
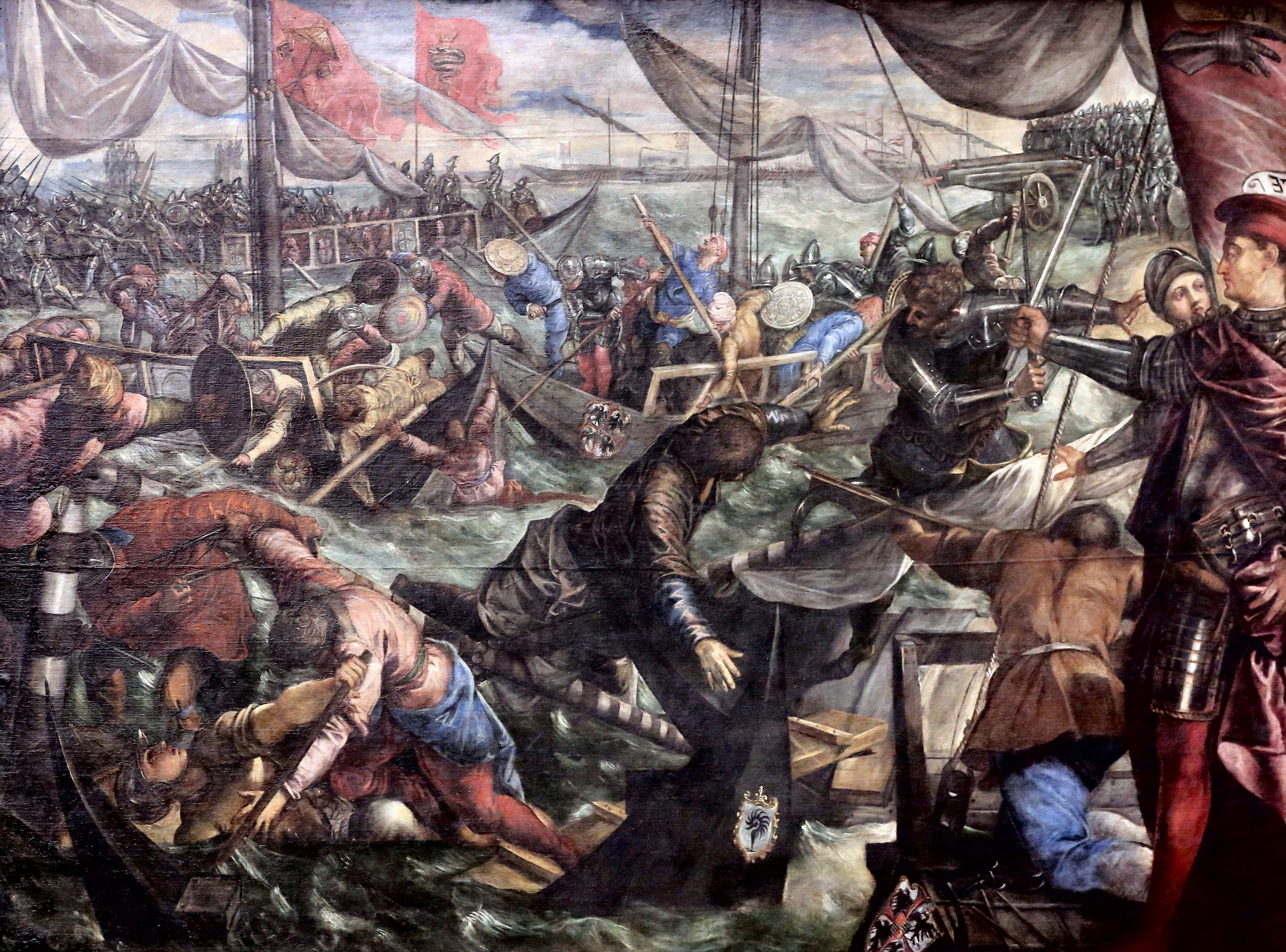
Ludovico II Gonzaga Defeats the Venetians at the Battle of Adige

=== Federico I Gonzaga Lifts the Swiss Siege of Legnano ===
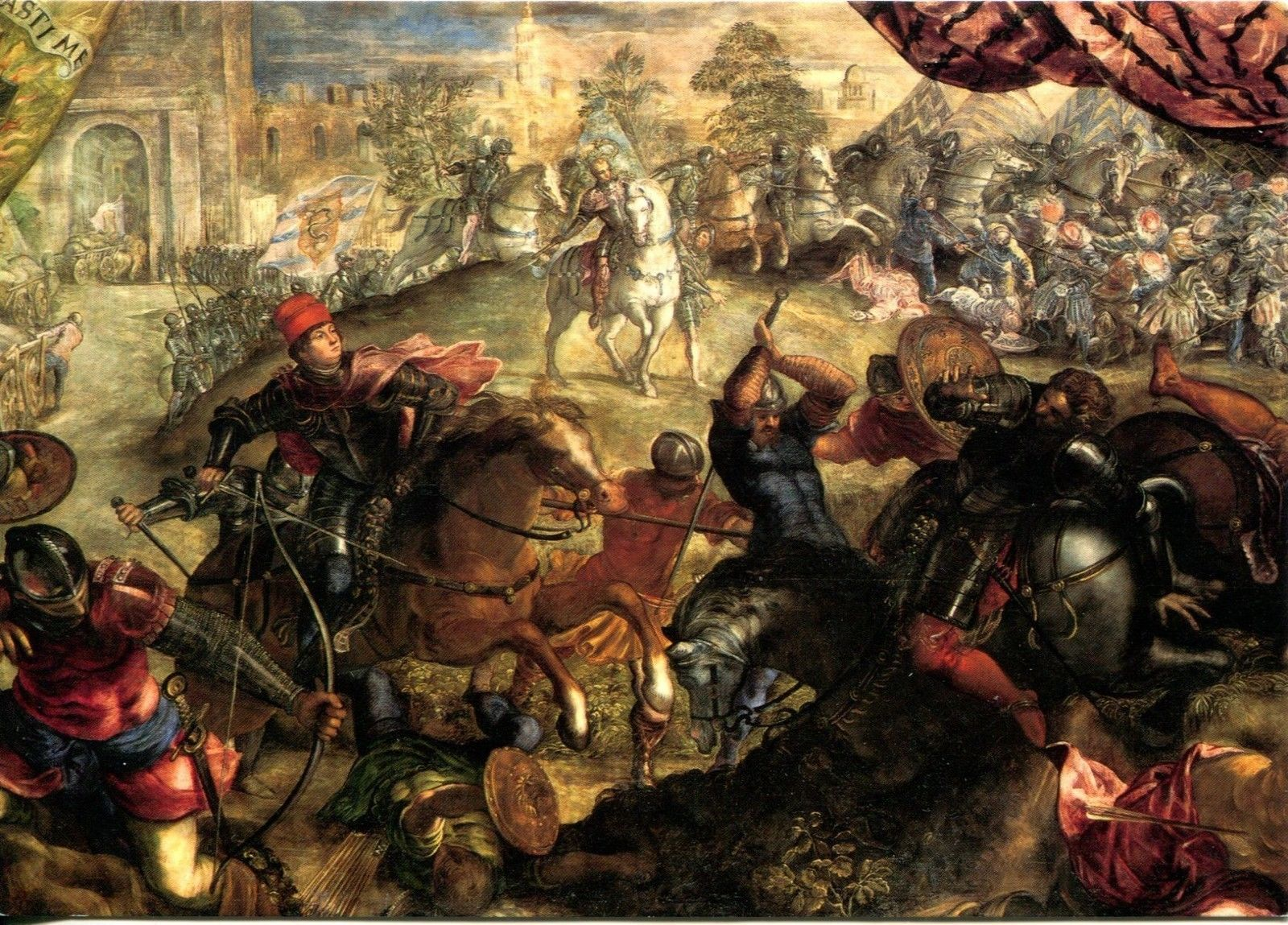
Federico I Gonzaga Lifts the Swiss Siege of Legnano

=== Francesco II Gonzaga at the Battle of Taro ===
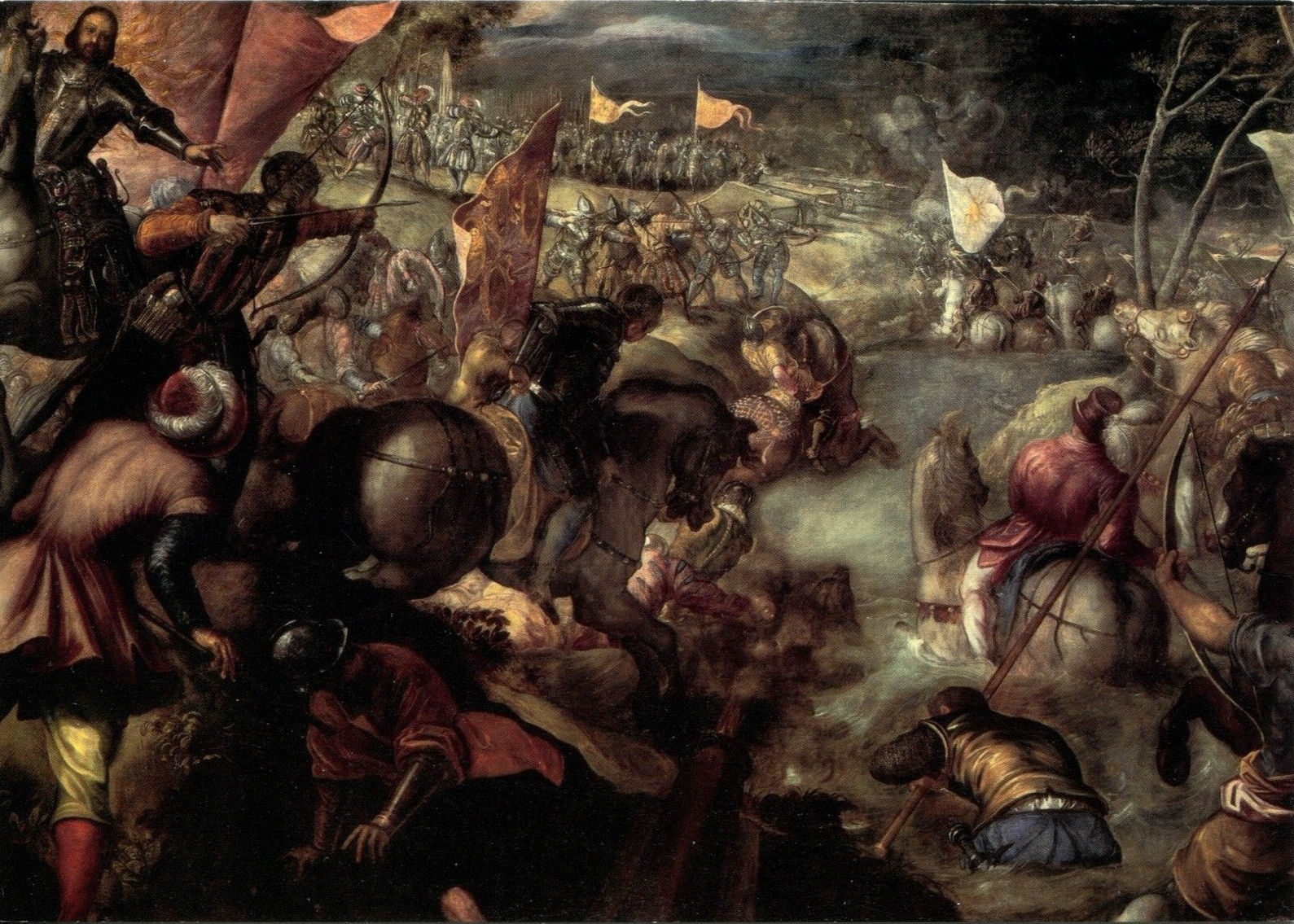
Francesco II Gonzaga at the Battle of Taro

== Sala dei Duchi ==
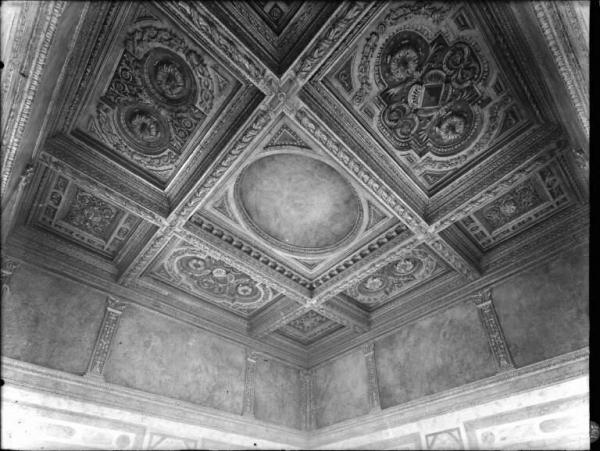
The Sala dei Duchi

=== Federico II Gonzaga Conquers Parma ===
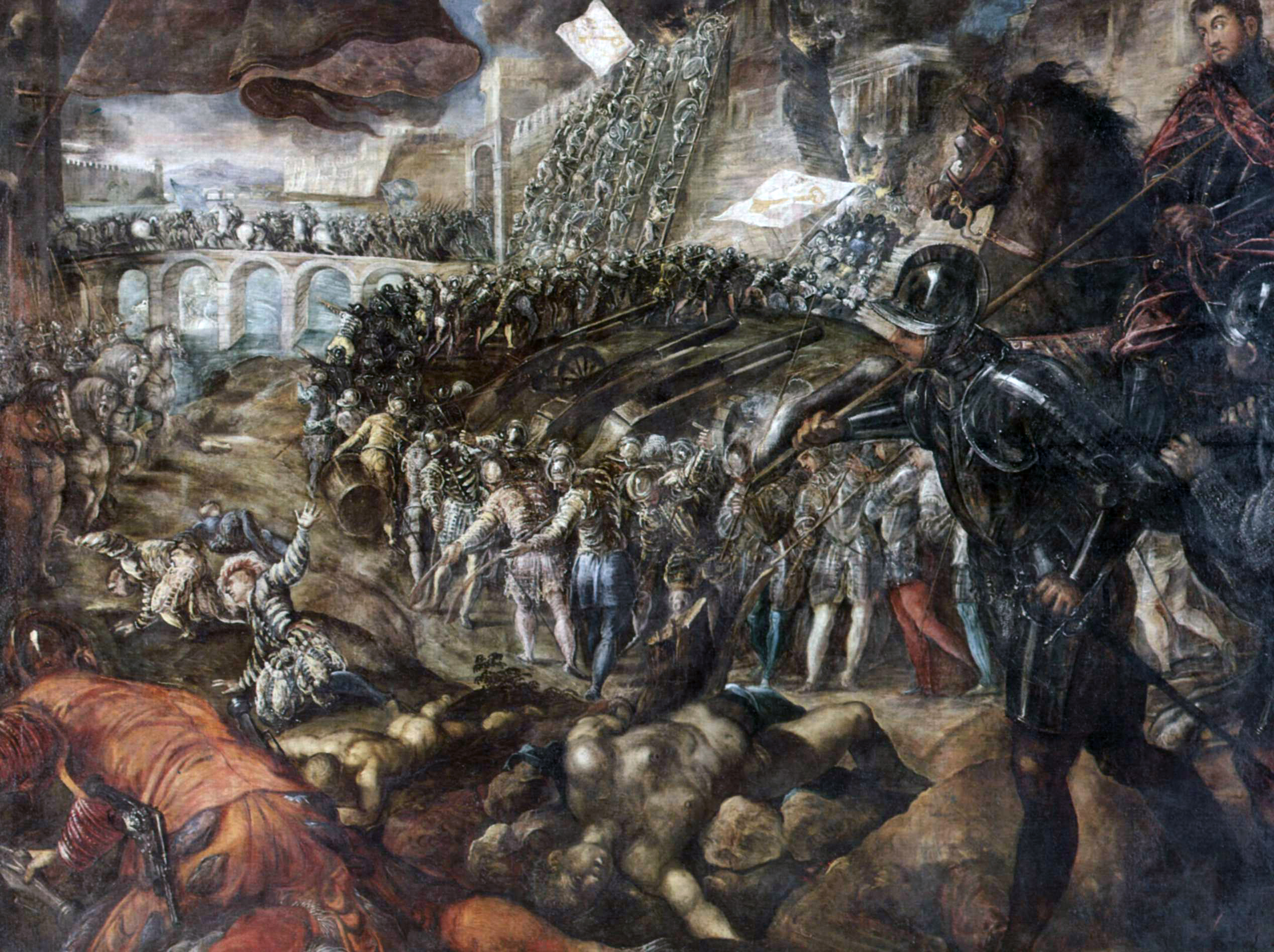
Federico II Gonzaga Conquers Parma

=== Federico II Gonzaga's Victorious Entry into Milan ===
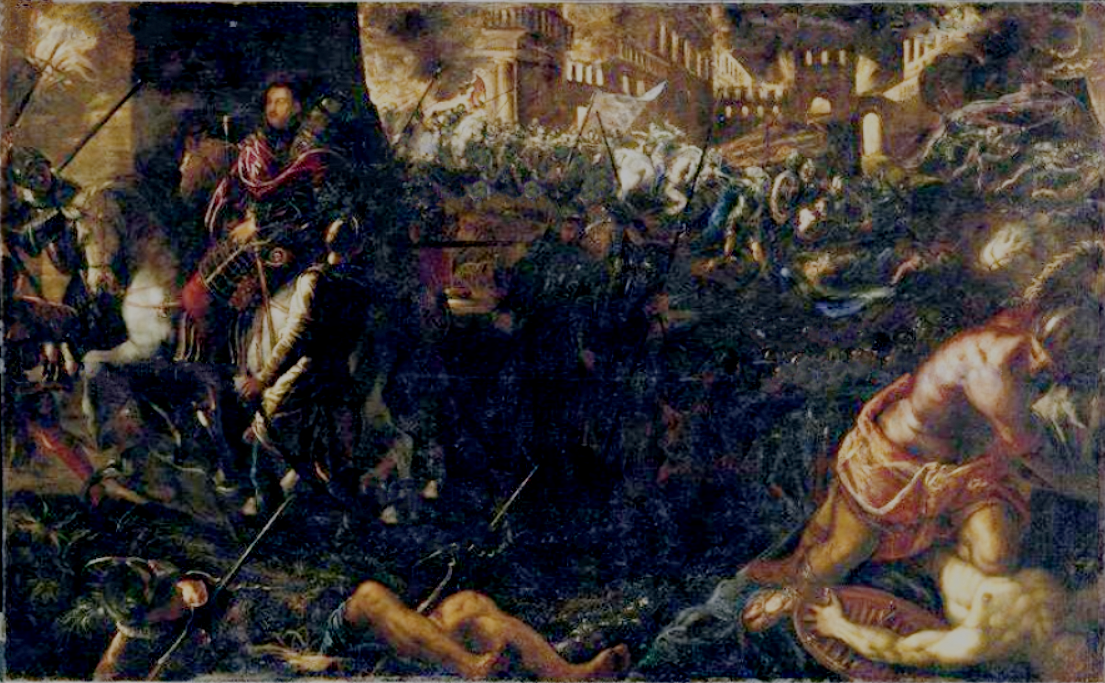
Federico II Gonzaga's Victorious Entry into Milan

=== Federico II Gonzaga Defends Padua ===
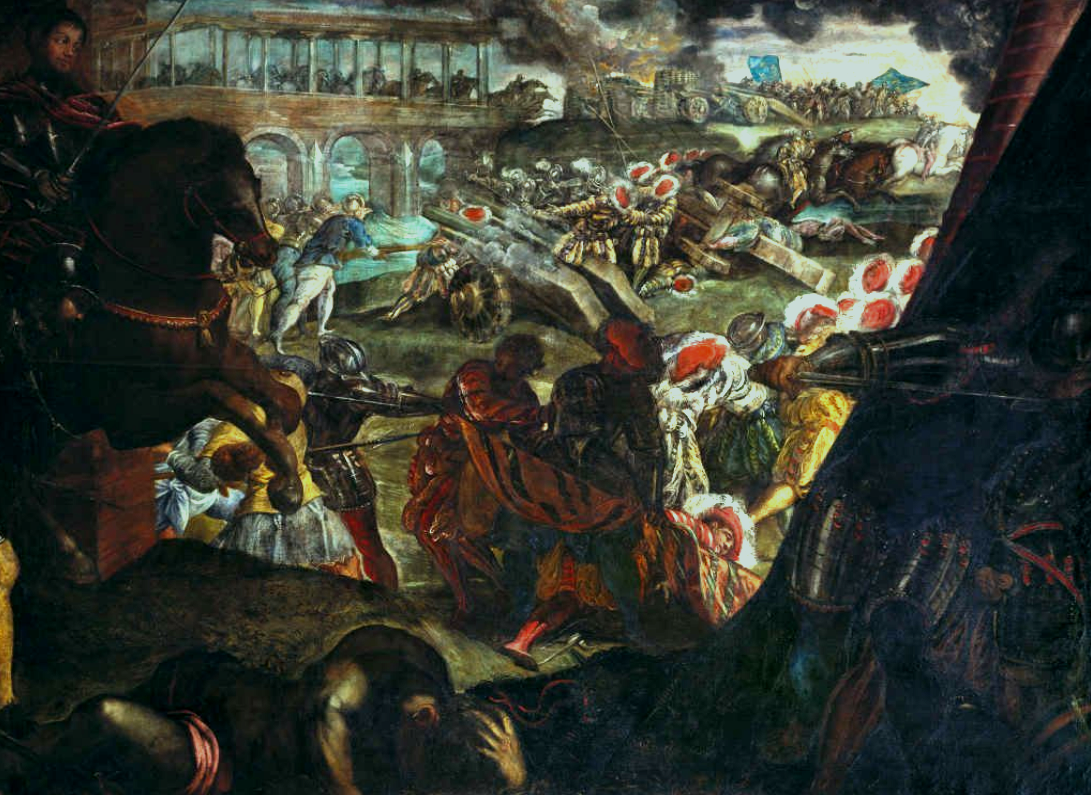
Federico II Gonzaga Defends Padua

=== Philip II of Spain Enters Mantua ===
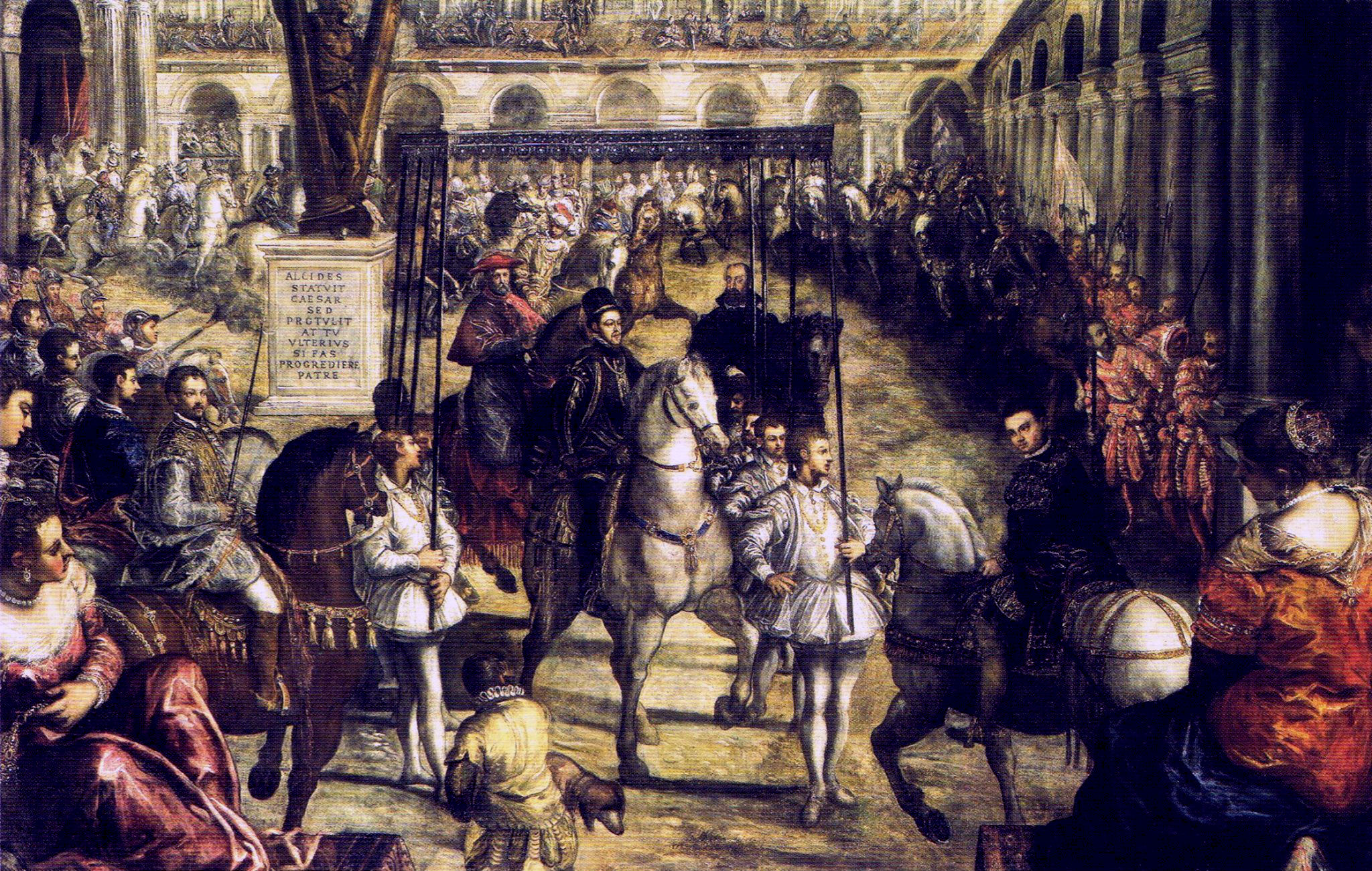
Philip II of Spain Enters Mantua

The work shows Philip, Infante of Spain (later to be Philip II) entering Mantua on 13 January 1549. The city was one of the stops on his journey from Valladolid to meet his father Charles V in Brussels, where he was to receive an oath of loyalty from the Low Countries, which Charles intended via the Pragmatic Sanction of 1549 to unify into a single state that he could then annex to the Spanish crown. It brings the cycle full circle, showing - like the first work - a representative of the main European power of the time arriving in Mantua and honouring or promoting a member of the Gonzaga family.

It is the only work in the cycle for which the commissioner's specifications do not survive, though one was probably provided - it is known Tintoretto was sent a print of the piazza Castello in Mantua, where Francesco III Gonzaga had welcomed Philip. Its depiction of the scene is similar to that in the 1552 El felicíssimo viaje del muy alto y muy poderoso Príncipe don Phelippe by Juan Calvete de Estrella, a member of Philip's entourage on the trip who kept a travel diary with particularly detailed accounts of the triumphal receptions in Mantua and other cities. It also bears similarities to the account of the Mantua visit in the 1575 Vita dell'invittissimo, e sacratissimo Imperator Carlo V by Alfonso de Ulloa. Calavete de Estrella (though not de Ulloa) specifically notes a temporary statue of Hercules between two pillars on a high podium inscribed ALCIDES STATUIT, CAESAR SED PROTULIT, AT TU ULTERIUS, SI FAS, PROGREDIRE PATRE, which also appears in the painting. It alluded to Charles V's famous seal, which showed the two Pillars of Hercules, whilst the inscription referred to Charles's motto PLUS ULTRA and predicted Philip's glory would exceed even that of his illustrious father.

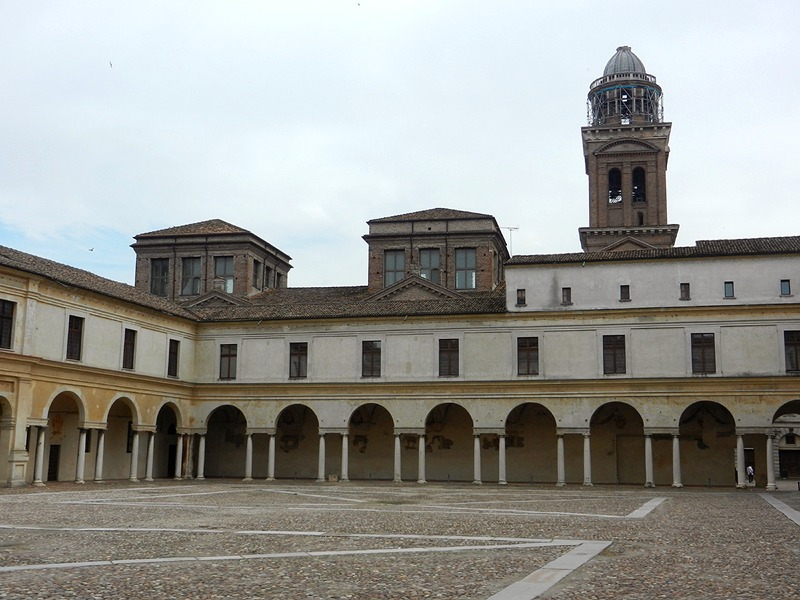
Mantova, Piazza Castello

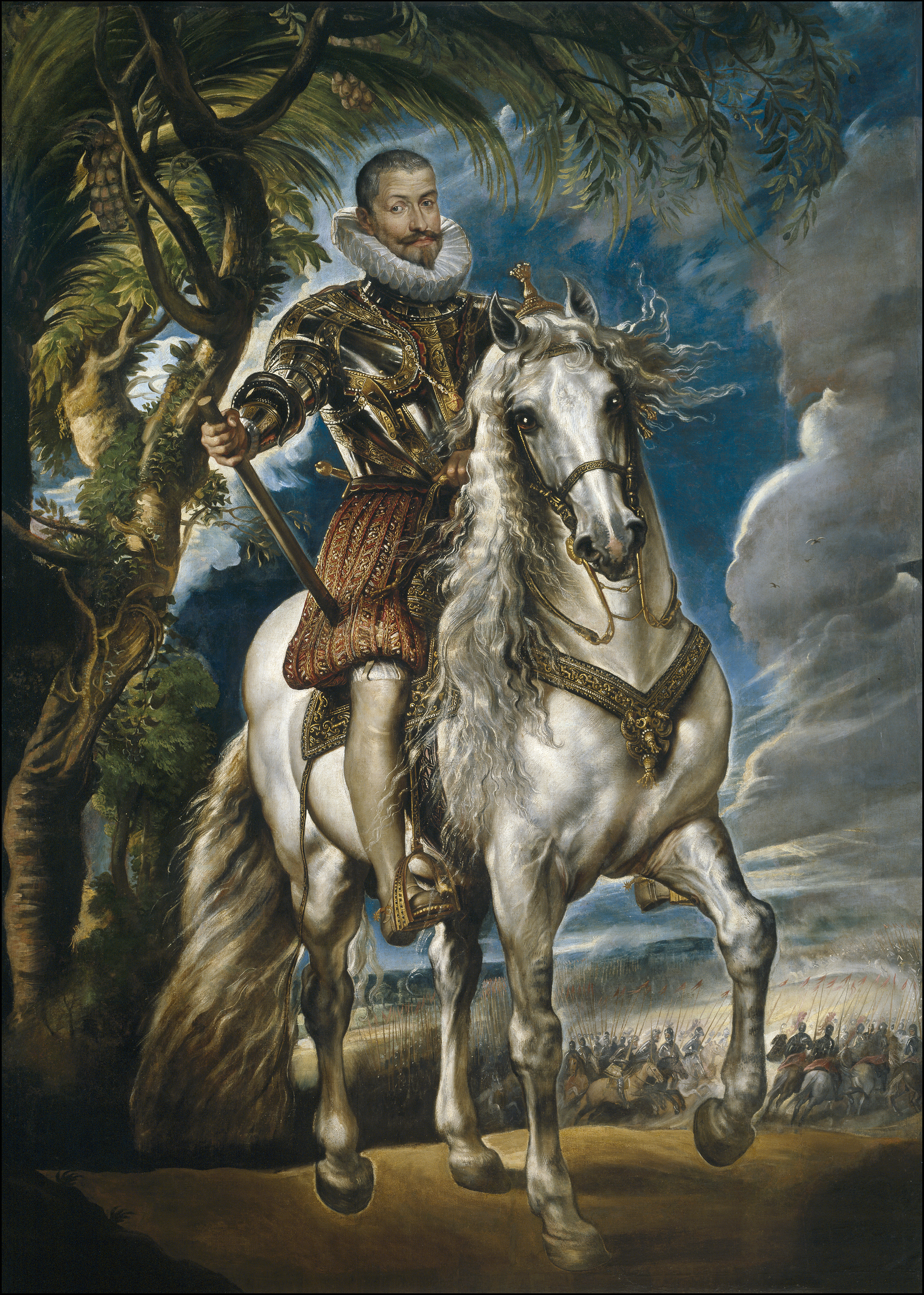
Rubens, Portrait of the Duke of Lerma, 1603, Madrid, Prado

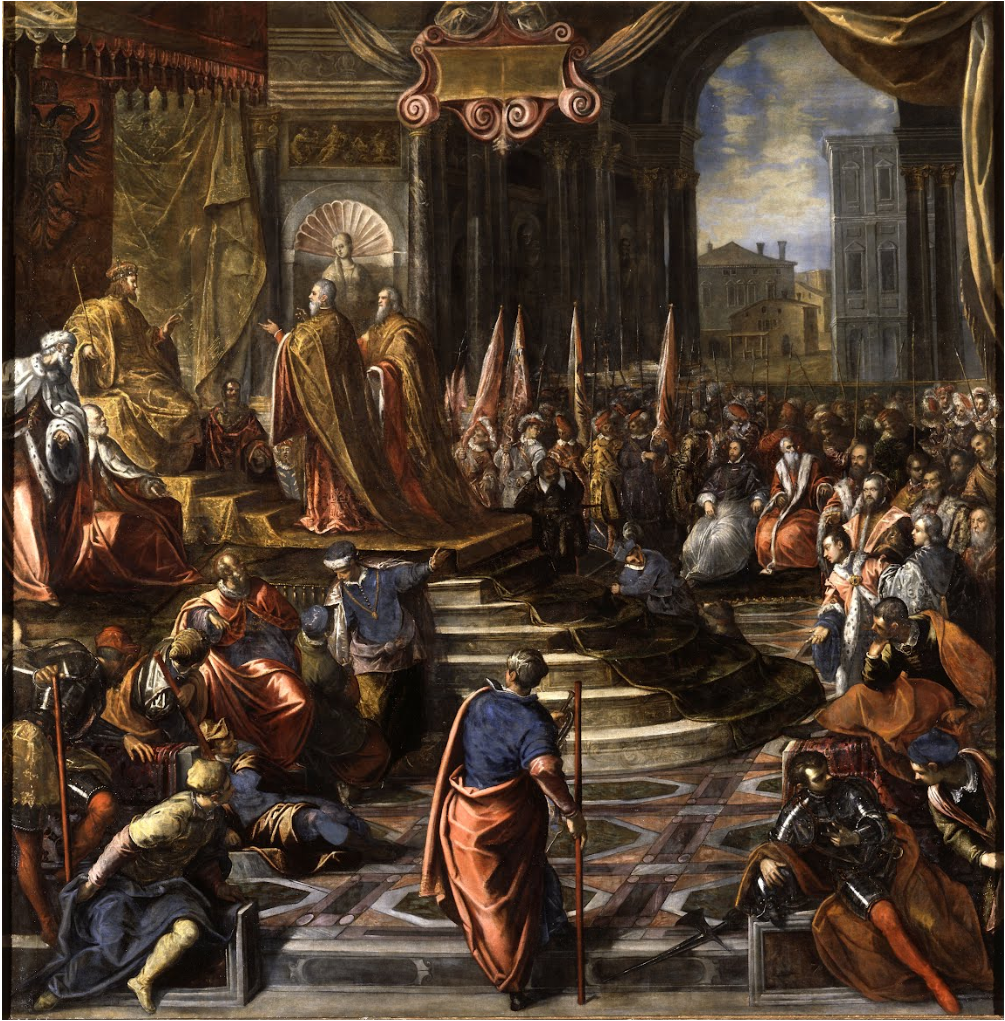
Domenico Tintoretto, Invio degli ambasciatori veneziani a Federico Barbarossa, 1590-1592, Palazzo Ducale, Venice

Of all the works in the cycle, Entry probably had the least autograph involvement of Tintoretto himself and is probably almost entirely by his son Domenico Tintoretto. This impression is reinforced by its similarities to The Sending of the Venetian Ambassadors to Frederick Barbarossa by Domenico, produced around ten years after the Fasti. Its portrayal of Philip made a strong impression on the young Rubens, who carefully studied the Fasti during his time in the service of Vincenzo Gonzaga, and the pose of the rider and horse and their diagonal foreshortening in his 1603 Equestrian Portrait of the Duke of Lerma are all very similar to the portrayal of Philip in this work.

==== Portraits ====
At the centre of the work Philip is shown wearing black and riding a white horse under a canopy held by pages in refined liveries, with Francesco III's uncles Ercole and Ferrante riding immediately behind. The second page of the right-hand line is Vespasiano Gonzaga, ordered to the Habsburg court in Valladolid in 1545 to be page of honour to Philip and historically attested as being present at the entry into Mantua.

Francesco III is shown on a white horse to the right, welcoming the princely procession, whilst to the left is the painting's commissioner on a brown horse with rich gold trappings, though he is shown as a young man rather than the eleven-year-old child he in fact was at the time of visit, perhaps showing that no portrait of him aged eleven was available to Tintoretto. A similar discrepancy can be seen in the portrait of Philip himself, more mature than the twenty-two-year-old he in fact was at the time of the visit and probably based on the official portraits of him disseminated by the Habsburg authorities after he took the Spanish throne in 1556.

The portrait of Ferrante is based on that of him as one of the donors in Fermo Ghisoni's Assumption with Donors held at the Santuario della Beata Vergine delle Grazie in Curtatone, whilst that of Ercole is based on a Ghisoni portrait of him. The portrayal of Francesco III is based on an anonymous full-length portrait now in a private collection, whilst that of Vespasiano is based on one of the anonymous small Gonzaga portraits now held at Ambras Castle.

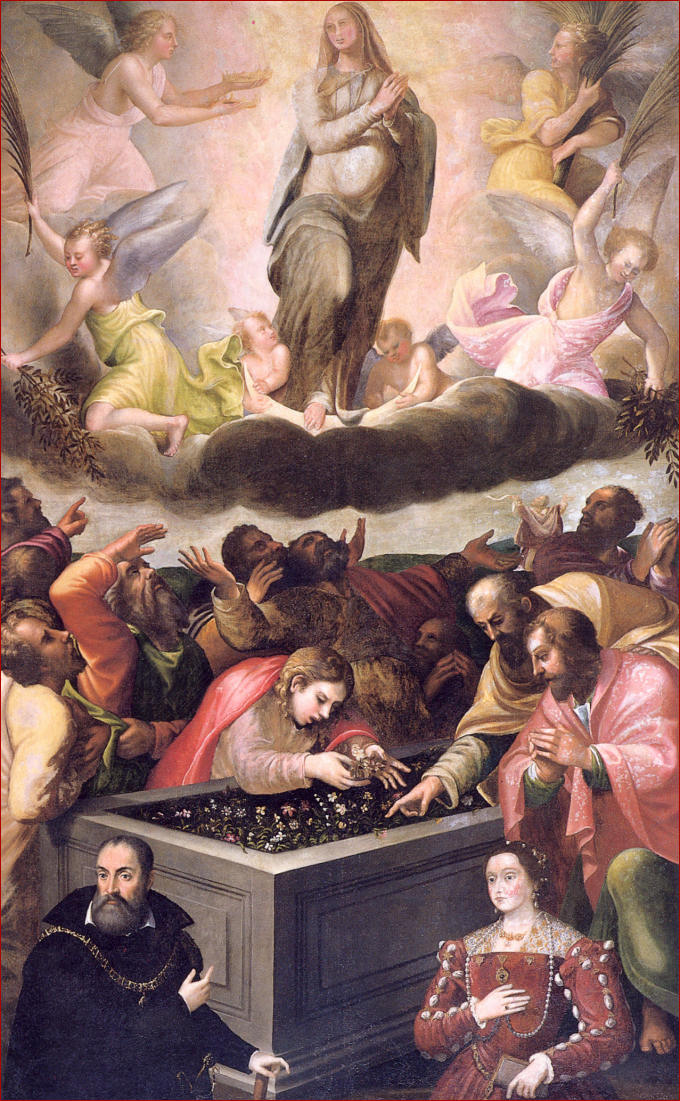
Fermo Ghisoni, Assumption with Donors, 1556, Church of Santa Maria delle Grazie, Curtatone

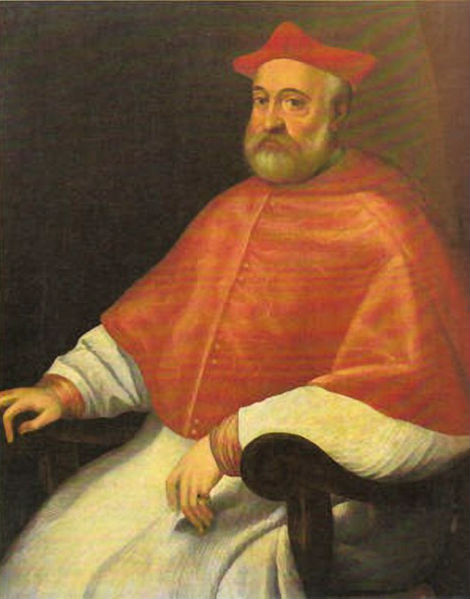
Fermo Ghisoni, Ercole Gonzaga, 1555-1560, Ducal Palace, Mantua

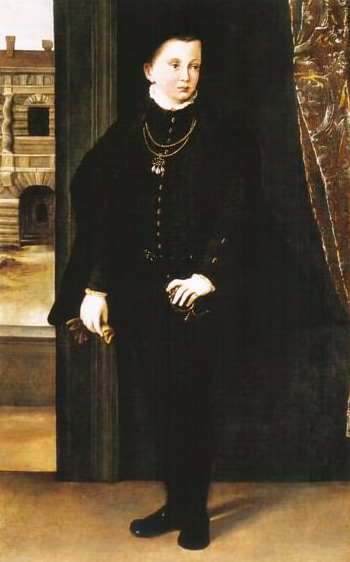
Anonymous, Francesco III Gonzaga, circa 1545, private collection

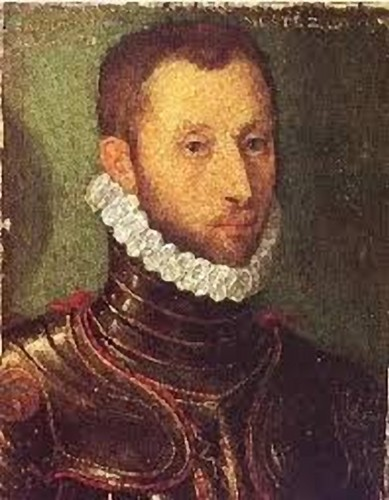
Anonymous, Vespasiano Gonzaga, 1570-1575, Ambras Castle, Innsbruck

== Sala dei Capitani ==
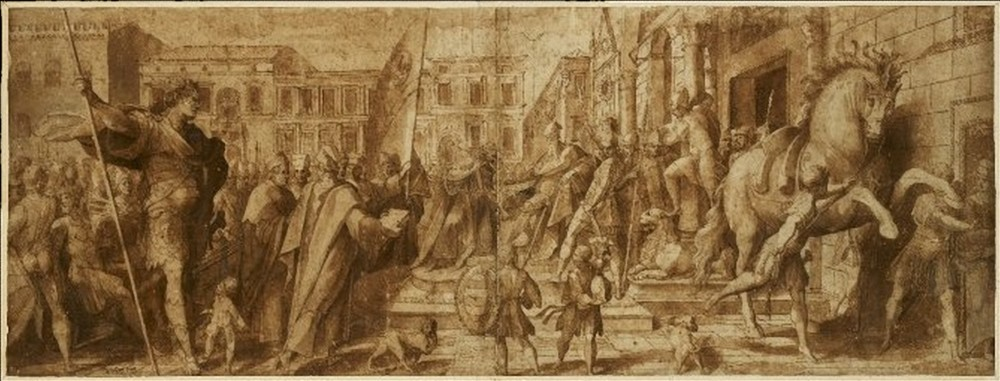
Luigi Gonzaga's Oath

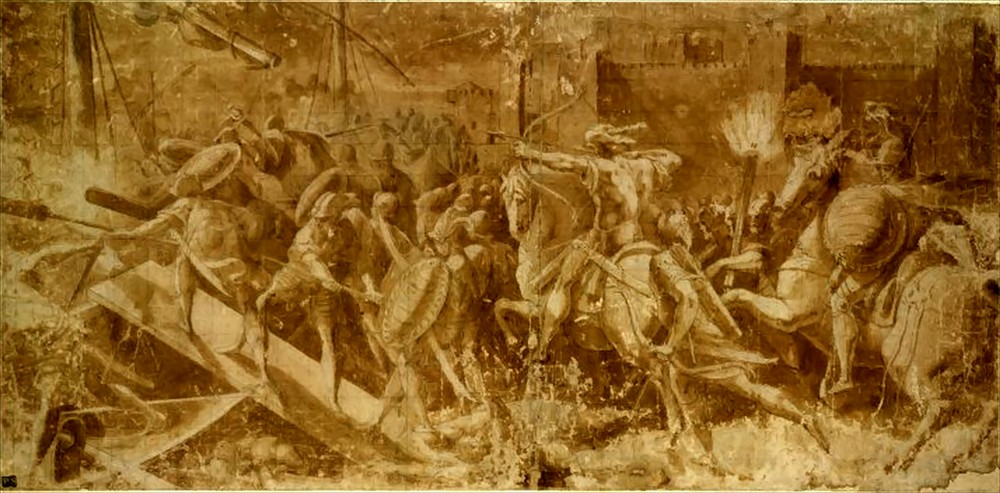
Night Battle on the Po

Once the paintings and decorative schemes of the Sala dei Marchesi and Sala dei Duchi were complete, the Duke proposed that Tintoretto add a third set of works covering the period between 1328 and 1433 when the Gonzagas were not marquesses but 'capitani del popolo' of Mantua. This would have hung in the Sala dei Capitani, the last room Guglielmo had added to the Palazzo Ducale. He declined the commission and so this set of works was instead produced by Lorenzo Costa the Younger.

All that survives of Costa's works are two preparatory drawings now in the British Museum. One of these is not definitively attributed to Costa and shows Ludovico Gonzaga swearing his oath as "capitano del popolo" (he was the first of the Gonzaga family to take up that post). It seems to have been copied from an earlier wall painting of the same subject, which survives and is variously attributed to Bernardino India and Benedetto Pagni. The other drawing's attribution to Costa is more certain and shows Ludovico's son Guido at a night battle at Borgoforte on the River Po during his time as "capitano del popolo".
