= Curzio Gonzaga =

Italian nobleman, writer and diplomat

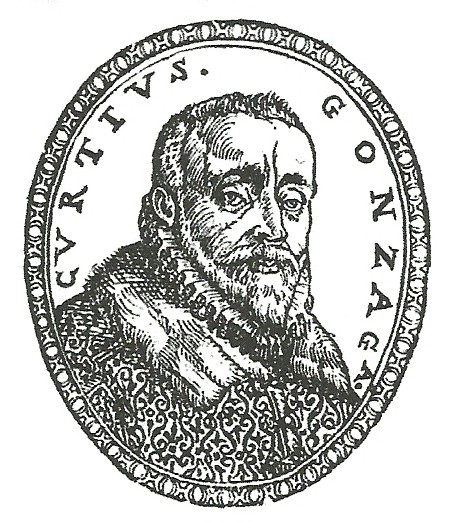
Portrait of Curzio Gonzaga, an illustration from "Il Fidamante", Venice, 1591.

Curzio Gonzaga (c.1530 - 25 August 1599) was an Italian nobleman, writer and diplomat. From 1595 onwards he was the first marquis of Palazzolo, held jointly with Claudio and Luigi Gonzaga.

His main work was the chivalric poem Il Fidamante, published in Mantua in 1582 and in Venice in 1591. It describes the wonderful deeds committed by a knight for the love of a very beautiful but harsh and insensitive woman. His Rime was published in Vicenza in 1585 and his comic play Gli inganni in Venice in 1592.

== Life ==
He was born in Mantua to marquis Luigi Gonzaga (? - 1549), who belonged to the Palazzolo cadet branch of the House of Gonzaga, and his wife Elisabetta Lampugnani, daughter of Ottaviano Lampugnani.

On 4 December 1543 he was made archpriest of Mantua Cathedral but instead of the priesthood (for which his family had intended him) he decided to become a soldier, writer and poet. Between 1557 and 1558 he was the Gonzagas' ambassador to Ottavio Farnese, Duke of Parma. In April 1559 cardinal Ercole Gonzaga, regent of the Duchy of Mantua, sent him as his delegate to Charles V, Holy Roman Emperor for the negotiation of the Treaty of Cateau-Cambrésis, which returned Monferrato to the Gonzagas.

A few months later he accompanied the cardinal to Rome (then without a pope after Paul III's death) and stayed in the city for a long time, taking part in literary and political life. He was admitted to the Accademia delle Notti Vaticane, founded by Carlo Borromeo, and conversed with Torquato Tasso. On his return to his homeland he attended the court of Ferrante II in Guastalla, then lived for a long time in Venice. In 1595 duke Vincenzo granted him the castle of Palazzolo in Monferrato and made him its marquis, but Curzio could not move there due to his ill health.

He died in Borgoforte and asked to be buried in the Annunziata church which he had built in Boccadiganda, in the territory of Borgoforte. His will made his close friend Maddalena Campiglia custodian of his writings. He was succeeded in the marquisate by Claudio and Luigi until 1621, then Luigi alone from 1621 to 1626.
