= Luigi I Gonzaga di Palazzolo =

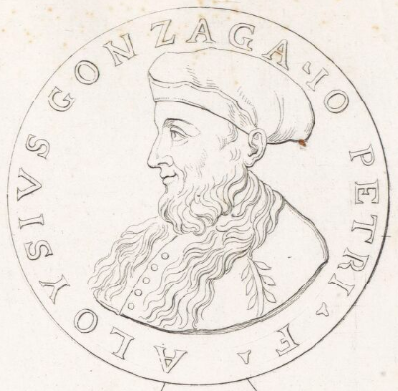
Medal of Luigi Gonzaga

Luigi Gonzaga was an Italian writer who also served as a soldier for the Duchy of Mantua and the Marquisate of Mantua.

== Life ==
He was a son of Giampietro Gonzaga of the 'Nobili' or 'Palazzolo' branch of the House of Gonzaga.

As a soldier he served Massimiliano Sforza, who made him a senator in 1513. He then moved to the Gonzaga court in Mantua, becoming an advisor to marquess Francesco II Gonzaga. In 1530 he was present at Charles V's coronation as Holy Roman Emperor in San Petronio, Bologna. He retired to Borgoforte, where he devoted himself to writing until his death at Borgo Virgilio in 1549.

== Marriage and issue ==
In 1502 he married Agnese Stanga Torelli, with whom he had four children:

- Zenoria (?-1554)
- Giampietro
- Camillo
- Curzio (1530–1599), first marquess of Palazzolo

In 1527 he married Elisabetta Lampugnani di Milano, with whom he had two children:

- Silvio (?-1579)
- Claudio (?-1586), priest

He also had one illegitimate son named Corrado.
