= Barbara Torelli Benedetti =

Italian playwright (1546 – after 1603)

Barbara Torelli Benedetti of Parma (1546 – after 1603) was an Italian author who wrote the first pastoral play by an Italian woman, Partenia. It was completed in 1587, and although it was not published but remained in manuscript form, it was well-known and highly thought of. It probably inspired Maddalena Campiglia’s Flori, written the next year. The poet Muzio Manfredi advised Torelli and helped to disseminate the play.
