= Claudio Gonzaga =

16th-century Italian priest

Claudio Gonzaga was an Italian priest.

Born in Borgoforte to Luigi I Gonzaga of the Palazzolo branch of the House of Gonzaga and his wife Elisabetta Lampugnani, pope Pius IV invited him to Rome, where he made him an apostolic protonotary and sent him to Philip II of Spain to convince him to join the Republic of Venice against the Ottoman Empire. Next he was nuncio extraordinary to Don John of Austria at the Battle of Lepanto before in 1572 becoming the pope's private chamberlain and commendatory abbot of Felonica. In 1578 pope Gregory XIII made him maggiordomo of the papal palace. He died in Pozzuoli in 1586 and was buried in Santa Maria di Piedigrotta in nearby Naples.
