= Maddalena Campiglia =

Italian poet (1553–1595)

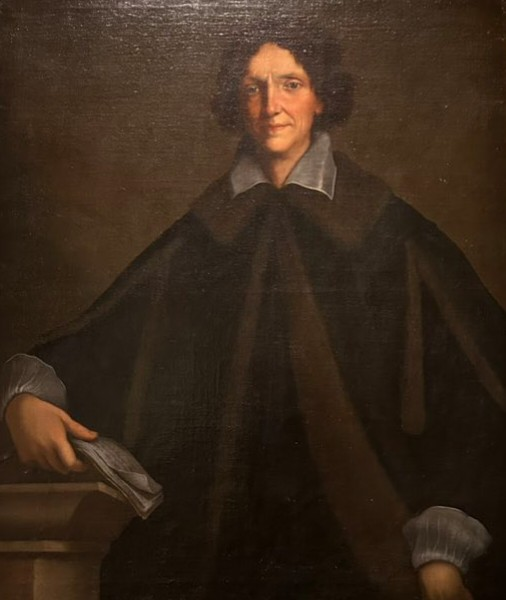
Maddalena Campiglia by Alessandro Maganza, Musei Civici di Vicenza

Maddalena Campiglia (April 13, 1553 - January 28, 1595) was an Italian poet. She is remembered for being praised by Torquato Tasso for her pastoral fable Flori, inspired by his Aminta.

== Biography ==
Maddalena Campiglia was born in Vicenza on April 13, 1553, an illegitimate child of Polissena Verlato and Carlo Campiglia. Both widowed nobles, they had also had two sons before Maddalena, but only regularized their union in 1565.

During her studies, the young Campiglia showed particular interest in literature, philosophy and music. Her intellectual development was accelerated by moving in the cultural circles meeting at the Vicenza villa owned by her cousin Elena, wife of the Marquis Guido Sforza Gonzaga. There she met Bernardino Baldi, Torquato Tasso and Curzio Gonzaga, Marquis of Palazzolo. A poet, a diplomat and a friend of writers and artists, Curzio became such a close friend of Campiglia that his will made put her in charge of his writings.

Presumably at the villa Gonzaga she met Dionisio da Colzè (or Calzé) whom she married in 1576; the marriage lasted until 1580, the year in which they separated and she began to live alone. She was not predisposed to become a mother and so at her insistence the marriage was never consummated. as shown by the acts of separation.

Maddalena Campiglia died in Vicenza on January 28, 1595, following a long illness that deprived her of her sight. In her last years, Campiglia approached various nunneries and became a Dominican tertiary. In her will she requested to be buried in the same vault as Abbess Giulia Cisotta, near the church of Santa Maria d'Araceli in Vicenza.

== Writings ==
1580 was also when she started writing, initially producing religious works which right from the start demonstrated her nonconformist spirit. According to Campiglia, virginity had to be lived out not as a constraint but as an effective means of achieving female independence from men. She wrote of the Virgin Mary as the supreme example of this principle, arguing that Mary had spontaneously chosen chastity and that God had chosen her to be Christ's mother because of the greatness of her choice. Campiglia expressed this concept in "Discorso intorno all'Annunciazione della Vergine" ("Discourse on the Annunciation to the Virgin Mary"), printed in Vicenza in 1585.

Campiglia's most recognized work was Flori, a "boscareccia" fable inspired by Tasso's Aminta. It was printed in Vicenza in 1588 and dedicated to Curzio Gonzaga. Flori is a virgin nymph devoted to the cult of Diana who is laid low by the death of her beloved friend Amaranta and who (despite being loved by her friend and fellow nymph Licori) is destined to fall in love with the first man she meets, a shepherd. Although in love with him, she will only accept a sexless marriage. In addition to the theme of virginity, the author introduces another delicate theme, that of love between women, which finds its greatest expression in the meaning of the phrase "Donna amando pur Donna essendo" ("loving a woman despite being a woman").

In 1589 she published Calisa. Two shepherds, Edreo and Clori, celebrate the marriage of Lico, son of Calisa, with Bice. In real life Calisa is Isabella Pallavicini Lupi, marquise of Soragna, protector of Campiglia, to whom the author also dedicated several other sonnets. After 1589, already affected by the illness that would kill her, Campiglia did not publish works of her own but contributed some of her sonnets to the collections Rime (published by A. Grillo, 1589) and Rime (published by O. Zambrini, 1594).
