= Antonio Gonzaga (condottiero) =

Italian condottiero (died 1496)

Antonio Gonzaga (died 6 January 1496) was an Italian condottiero.

He was a son of Luigi Gonzaga and Luigia Gonzaga, who belonged to the Palazzolo and Novellara branches of the House of Gonzaga respectively. On his way to Rome to be crowned Holy Roman Emperor by pope Nicholas V, Frederick III of Habsburg made Antonio a knight at Ferrara in 1452.

== Marriages and issue ==
He married Francesca Uberti and later Orsina Cavriani. By them he had five children:

- Ludovico (?-1503), monk
- Agostina, nun
- Giampietro (?-1511), condottiero, who married Costanza Stanga di Cremona then Agostina Martinengo.
- Cesare
- Luigia (1458–1542), married Cristoforo Castiglione, with whom he was father to the famous humanist Baldassarre Castiglione
