= Cesare Gonzaga =

Italian condottiero and writer (1476-1512)

Cesare Gonzaga (1476 - September 1512) was an Italian condottiero and writer.

== Life ==
Born in Mantua to Giampietro Gonzaga, a member of the 'Palazzolo' cadet branch of the House of Gonzaga, he became a member of the Knights Hospitaller. In 1499 he entered the service of Ercole I d'Este and later that of Francesco II Gonzaga. In 1503 he fought for Cesare Borgia and soon after shifted to the service of Guidobaldo da Montefeltro, Duke of Urbino. He took part in several battles and became one of the most influential men at the ducal court, befriending Pietro Bembo. Cesare and his cousin Baldassarre Castiglione jointly produced a collection of Rime, a Silloge per Elisabetta Gonzaga and the eclogue Tirsi - the last two were both dedicated to Guidobaldo's wife Elisabetta Gonzaga.

He was counsellor to the duke and his successor Francesco Maria I Della Rovere and was a witness at the time of the latter's adoption as Guidobaldo's heir. On Guidobaldo's death in 1508 Pope Julius II chose Cesare as his ambassador to the new duke of Urbino. In 1509 he was put in command of the papal army in Romagna in its campaign against the Republic of Venice. He took part in the siege of Brisighella and in 1511 the siege of Mirandola beside Julius II. After fighting in Ravenna in 1512, he besieged Bologna where he died that September.

== Writing ==
- Rime
- Silloge per Elisabetta Gonzaga
- Tirsi

== Children ==
He had three children:

- Cesare
- Giovanni
- Camillo
