= Virgilio, Lombardy =

Virgilio
- Frazione
- Location of Virgilio in Italy
- Coordinates: 45°7′N 10°47′E
- Country: Italy
- Region: Lombardy
- Province: Province of Mantua (MN)
- Comune: Borgo Virgilio

Area
  - Total: 31.3 km^{2} (12.1 sq mi)

Population (2011)
  - Total: 11,282
  - Density: 360/km^{2} (934/sq mi)
- Time zone: UTC+1 (CET)
  - Summer (DST): UTC+2 (CEST)
- Postal code: 46030
- Dialing code: 0376

Virgilio is a frazione of the comune (municipality) of Borgo Virgilio in the Province of Mantua in the Italian region Lombardy, located about 130 kilometres (81 mi) southeast of Milan and about 6 kilometres (4 mi) south of Mantua. It was a separate comune until 2014, when it was merged with Borgoforte.

== People ==
According to legend, the village of Andes (Pietole Vecchia), a short distance from the center of Pietole in modern Virgilio, is the birthplace of the Roman poet Virgil (70 BCE – 19 BCE).

The comune di Virgilio is cited as "Pietoli patria di Virgilio" in the Gallery of Maps located in the Vatican Museums and painted by Ignazio Danti.
