= Giampietro Gonzaga di Palazzolo =

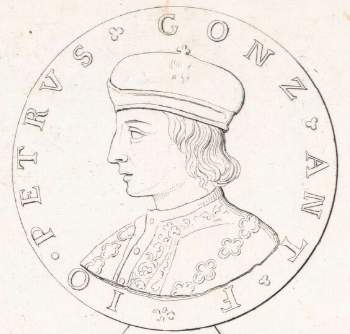
Medal of Giampietro Gonzaga

Giampetro Gonzaga (died 1511) was an Italian soldier of the 'Palazzolo' or 'Nobili' branch of the House of Gonzaga. He married Costanza Stanga di Cremona then Agostina Martinengo.

== Life ==
Son of Antonio Gonzaga (?-1496) and Francesca Uberti, he was made a knight of the duchy of Ferrara on 24 February 1481 by Ercole I d'Este, who was then a guest at the wedding of Chiara Gonzaga to Gilberto di Borbone in Mantua. He was buried in San Francesco, Mantua.

== Children ==
- Cesare, condottiero
- Francesco
- Antonio
- Luigi (?-1549), soldier and writer
- Agostino, Bishop of Reggio Calabria
