= Equestrian Portrait of the Duke of Lerma =

Painting by Peter Paul Rubens

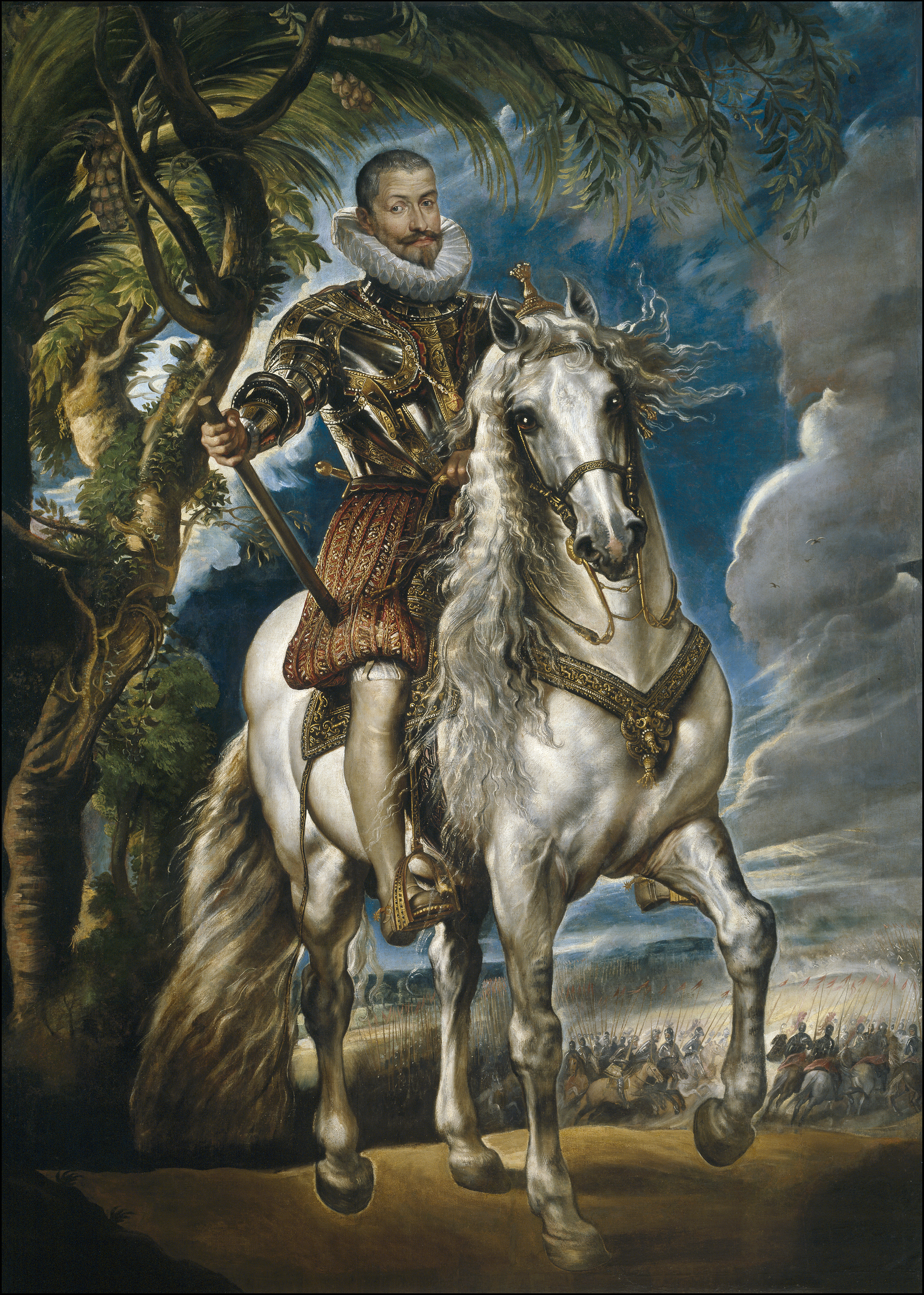
Equestrian Portrait of the Duke of Lerma (1603) by Rubens

Equestrian Portrait of the Duke of Lerma is an oil on canvas portrait of Francisco Gómez de Sandoval, 1st Duke of Lerma by Rubens, executed in 1603, now in the Prado in Madrid.
