= Guido Sforza Gonzaga =

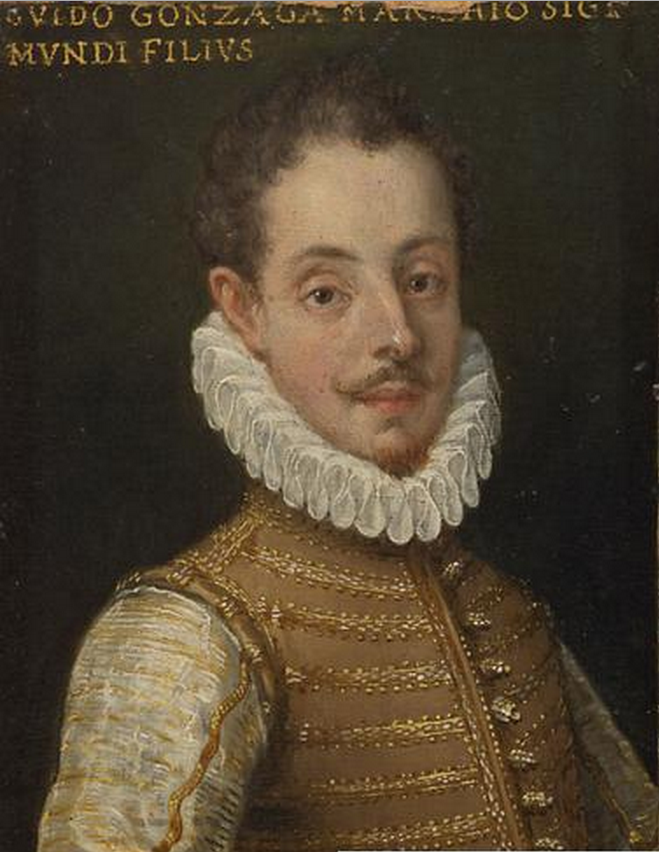
Anonymous miniature portrait of Guido Sforza Gonzaga.

Guido Sforza Gonzaga (1552 – 23 February 1607) was an Italian nobleman and prince of the Holy Roman Empire.

== Life ==
He was a son of marquis Sigismondo II Gonzaga and Lavinia Rangoni, meaning that he belonged to the Marchesi or Vescovato cadet branch of the House of Gonzaga, a branch that originated with Giovanni Gonzaga, lord of Vescovato.

Guido served as Grand Chamberlain to Guglielmo Gonzaga, Duke of Mantua, then the same duke's ambassador to Maximilian II. He also fought against the Ottoman Empire in Hungary.

== Marriage and issue ==
He and his wife Elena Campiglia (?-1596) had eight children:

- Eleonora (1591-?)
- Elena, became a nun
- Pirro Maria (1590–1628)
- Sigismonda (1587–1595)
- Elisabetta (1591-?)
- Giuliana (1593–1599)
- Caterina (1589–1609), became a nun
- Laura (1595-?)
