= Borgo Virgilio =

Borgo Virgilio Borch Vergili (Emilian)
- Comune
- Comune di Borgo Virgilio
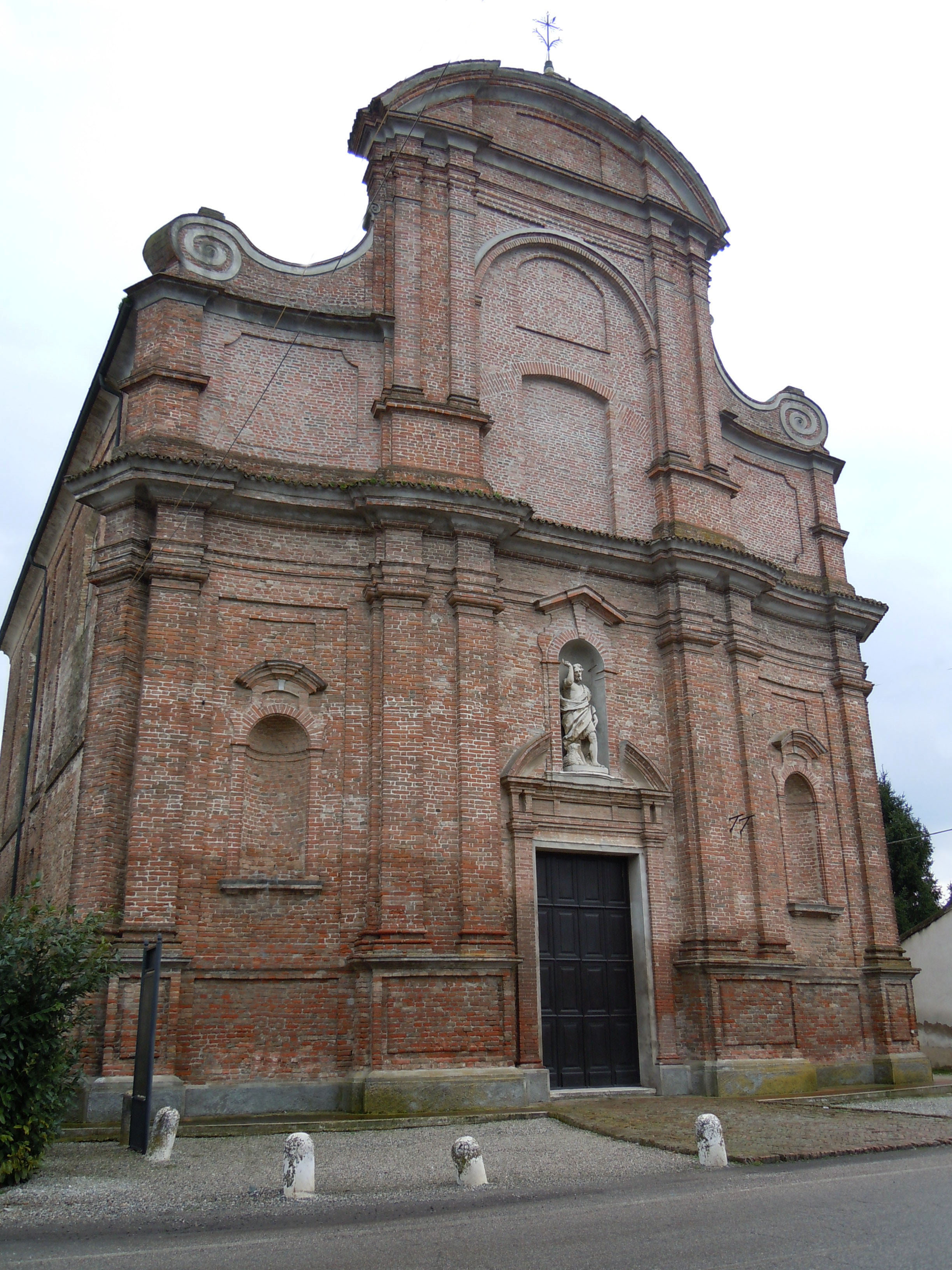
- Church of San Giovanni Battista, Borgo Virgilio

- Location within Italy Location within Lombardy
- Coordinates: 45°3′N 10°45′E
- Country: Italy
- Region: Lombardy
- Province: Province of Mantua (MN)
- Founded: 4 February 2014
- Frazioni: Boccadiganda, Cappelletta, Cerese, Pietole, Romanore, San Cataldo, San Nicolò Po, Scorzarolo, Vignale

Government
  - Mayor: Alessandro Beduschi

Area
  - Total: 69.99 km^{2} (27.02 sq mi)
- Elevation ISTAT: 21 m (69 ft)

Population (30 April 2017)ISTAT
  - Total: 14,660
  - Density: 209.5/km^{2} (542.5/sq mi)
- Demonym: Borgovirgiliani
- Time zone: UTC+1 (CET)
  - Summer (DST): UTC+2 (CEST)
- Postal code: 46021
- Dialing code: 0376
- Website: Official website

Borgo Virgilio (Lower Mantovano: Borch Vergili) is a comune in the province of Mantua, in Lombardy, created with effect from 25 May 2014 from the merger of the former comuni of Borgoforte and Virgilio. A local referendum to approve the creation of this comune was held on 1 December 2013, when the outcome of voting across Borgoforte and Virgilio were 68% in favour and 32% against.
