= Borgoforte =

- Frazione
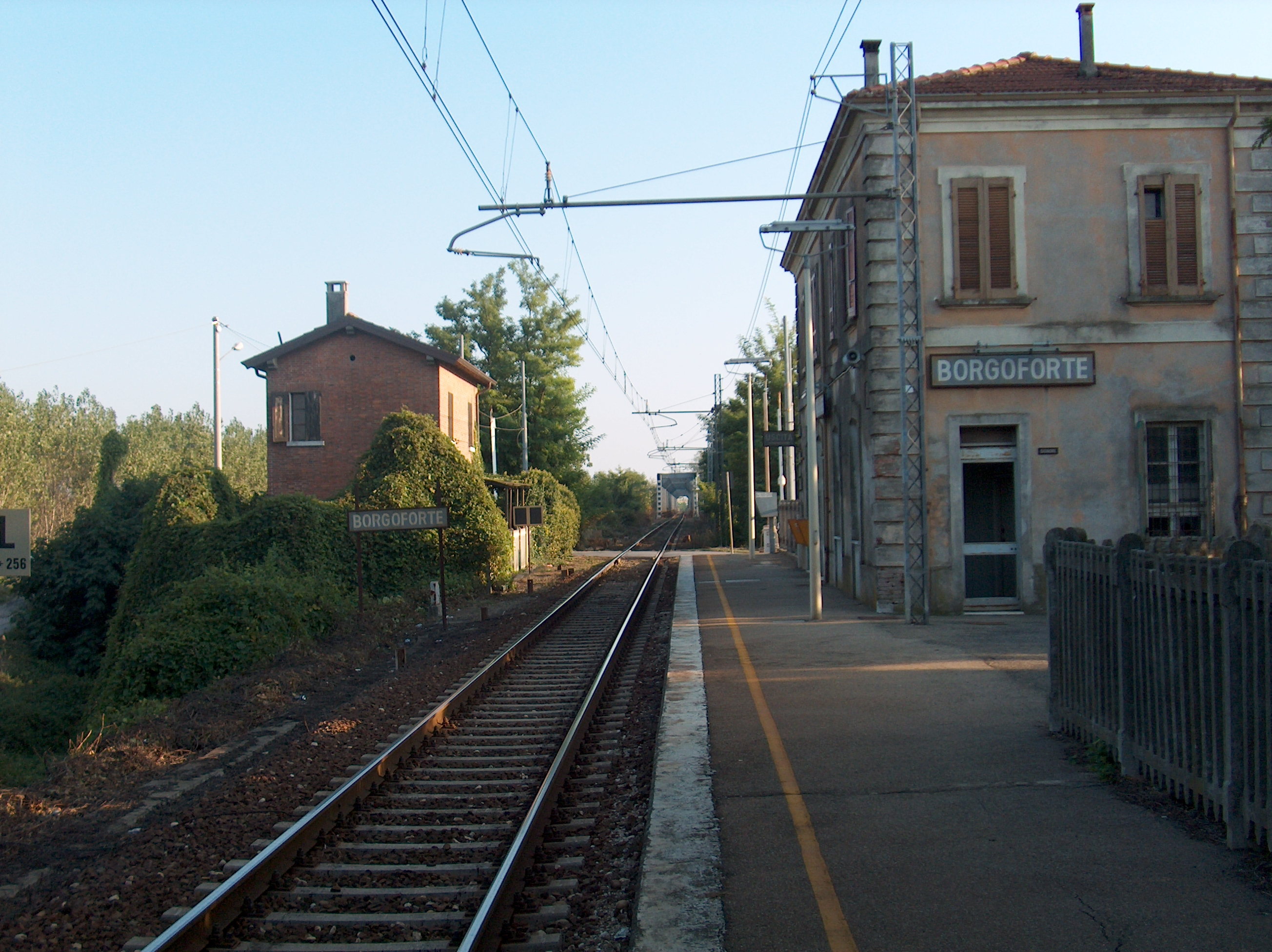
- View of Borgoforte's train station.

- Location of Borgoforte in Italy
- Coordinates: 45°3′N 10°45′E
- Country: Italy
- Region: Lombardy
- Province: Mantua (MN)
- Comune: Borgo Virgilio
- Elevation: 19 m (62 ft)

Population (Dec. 2004)
  - Total: 3,419
- Demonym: Borgofortesi
- Time zone: UTC+1 (CET)
  - Summer (DST): UTC+2 (CEST)
- Postal code: 46030
- Dialing code: 0376

Borgoforte is a frazione of the comune (municipality) of Borgo Virgilio in the Province of Mantua in the Italian region Lombardy, located about 130 kilometres (81 mi) southeast of Milan and about 14 kilometres (9 mi) southwest of Mantua. In 2014 it merged with Virgilio to form the municipality of Borgo Virgilio.

It is home to a Rocca (castle or fortress), founded by the House of Gonzaga in the 13th century. After various vicissitudes, it was an important stronghold of the Austrian Empire in the Kingdom of Lombardy–Venetia, being captured by Italian troops during the Third Italian Independence War in 1866.
