= History of Sint-Oedenrode =

Flag of Sint-Oedenrode

Coat of Arms of Sint-Oedenrode

Sint-Oedenrode is a moderately urbanized city and capital of the former municipality of the same name (since 2017 part of Meierijstad) in the province of North Brabant. The city is located in the Meierij of 's-Hertogenbosch. Sint-Oedenrode counts 17,928 inhabitants (August 1, 2013, source: CBS) and has an area of 64.25 km². The municipality has traditionally city rights since 1232, and was known as a "Vlek" (market town) in the past. Today it is still a large town. From southeast to northwest, the city is split by the river the Dommel.

== Etymology ==
The following story is based on a popular belief (saga)

According to legend, Sint-Oedenrode owes its name to Saint Oda. The saga goes as follows: This woman was a mythical blind born Scottish, possibly Irish, daughter of king Eugenius VII, who around the year 700, along with a servant was sent on a pilgrimage on the mainland by her father. Oda was miracilously cured from her blindness after she visited the tomb of Saint Lambert of Maastricht in Liège. She decided she wanted to devote her life to the Christian god and become a nun. She returned to her father who had decided a husband for her. Oda did not wish to marry as was her father's wish. In a desperate attempt of not marrying, she decided to flee to the mainland. She started to travel from one place to another, wherever she could find silence for worshipping. Time on time she was disrupted in her worshipping by magpies, and she fled from the birds.

Eventually she arrived in Toxandria (Austrasia) in a little settlement called Rode (old Dutch word for a man made open place in the woods), where the villagers built her a hut on the heath and she settled as a hermit. After she died in 726 A.D. the villagers were getting pilgrims from the entire region, and started to call the place Sint-Oda's-Rode, which became Sint-Oedenrode in present-day speaking.

== History ==
=== Prehistory and Roman times ===
The first traces of human presence date from the period between 10,000 and 9,000 BC. The first settlements whose remains were found during the excavation of the Dommel riverbank near the Hazenputten in the Vresselse Bossen, (Nijnsel), date from a period between 9000 and 8000 BC. In the Bronze Age the first farmers settled in and around Sint-Oedenrode. About the following era is not much known.

First records of the settlement called Rhode date from 500. Sint-Oedenrode was a small settlement on an elevated place near the river Dommel. The settlements on both riverbanks (Rhode and Eerschot) merged into one larger settlement.

In the 11th century the Lords of Rode built a castle on the elevated area (during excavations in 2005 remains of the castle were uncovered, proving the early records to be valid). The Eerschot part of the settlement constructed the first church (the church has been rebuilt many times over the centuries; the early base can still be seen in the church which is nowadays named Knoptoren which means Bud Tower).

The settlement thrived and became an important place in the region. Sint-Oedenrode was granted city status in 1232 by the Duke of Brabant (at that time Hendrik I of Brabant). This promoted Sint-Oedenrode to the capital of Peelland (the name of the region in North Brabant).

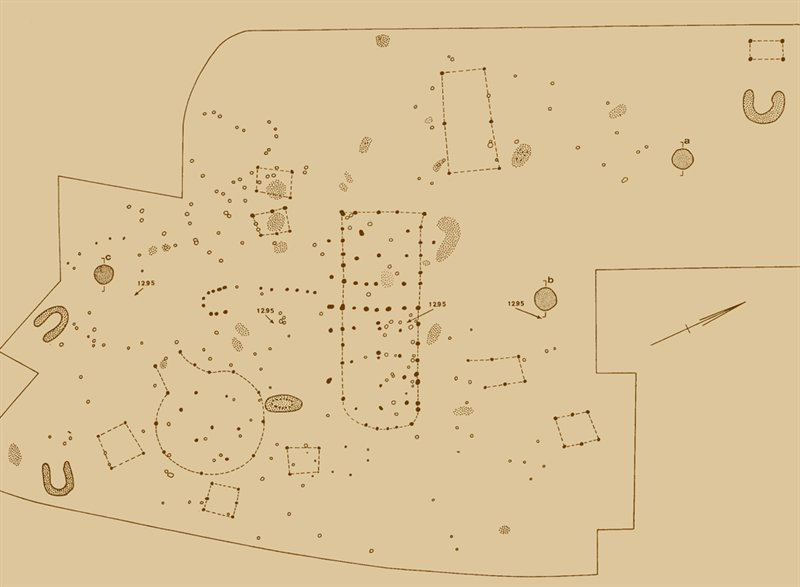
A map of the excavation of a settlement from the early Bronze Age, around 1500 BC in Nijnsel, in the municipality Sint-Oedenrode. The main building within the excavated portion is a farm of 17 meters by 6 meters. The outer wall consisted of poles that were connected with braid and were covered with clay. The posts within the farm will have borne the roof. A series of heavy poles on the south side of the farm probably supported a far extended roof on that side that was necessary in view of the down pouring rain that could wash away the clay there. In the long walls of the farmhouse opposite to each other there are two wide entrances forming a corridor which divided the building into a living area and a shed or barn. Around the farm there were numerous outbuildings. The most notable was a circular building that was probably a sheepfold. The other buildings are square or rectangular sheds and called "Spiekers": constructions of four or six poles with a raised floor for the storage of grain and hay. Northwest of the main building was a large barn of 7 by 3.5 meters. The many other posts will have served a variety of small buildings that belong to a farm like racks, an apiary, doghouse etc. The dark spots on the map were pits which were probably used for manure or the storing of winter silage.

=== County of Rode ===
The first reclamation took place in the early Middle Ages on fertile woodland along the Dommel. The oldest core and the original parish of Sint-Oedenrode is located in Eerschot, now part of Sint-Oedenrode. In this place were the Lords of Rode established before they moved further along the Dommel, where they built their castle "Rode". In the earliest period in the early Middle Ages, Sint-Oedenrode formed the core of the county Rode. There is no exact size of this county known, but following the Roois customary law, which applied to the corresponding places, there can still an estimation be made of the size of the county. The customary law of Rode was imposed for the so-called associates of Rode. This included Sint-Oedenrode, Liempde, Son en Breugel, Veghel, Erp, Schijndel, Stiphout, Lieshout, Aarle-Beek, Bakel, Deurne, Lierop, Tongelre, Nuenen, Gerwen and Nederwetten. They were able to appeal at the so-called main court in Sint-Oedenrode.

During this period, the inhabitants of these villages were therefore designated by the name Rodenaren and received their land rights by Roois law. The Roois law was in 1547 for the first time been put in writing. But part of the customary law, such as inheritance rights and Roois fief rights which are already mentioned in 1312, is according to historian Martin van Asseldonk possibly dating back to the days of the county.

The Lords of Rode possessed goods around the Castle of Rode, but also in Eerschot, Schijndel, Veghel, Erp, Son and Liempde. There were real property of the feudal lords of Rode, including the Baexhoeve (Baex Farmstead) in Veghel and several properties in Sint-Oedenrode itself.

The county Rode is possibly the precursor of the quarter Peelland.

In the 14th century a small castle was built named Strijpe, it was later expanded in the 19th century and renamed Henkeshage.

=== Duchy of Brabant ===
With the sale of the county Rode by Otto II, Count of Guelders to Henry I, Duke of Brabant, due to an old agreement, in 1231 Sint-Oedenrode becomes a part of the Duchy of Brabant as a part of the Meierij (Bailiwick) of 's-Hertogenbosch. As a consequence of this agreement and as a compensation of the loss of their sovereignty the city becomes the administrative capital of the first known quarter Peelland.

In 1232 Sint-Oedenrode got freedom rights. From then on Sint-Oedenrode and the nearby located Eerschot is referred to as De Oude Vrijheid (The Old Freeheerlijkheid). The new town had good natural defenses, as it was situated in a bend of the Dommel and was surrounded by the marshy fields called the Dommelbeemden.

During this era the Sint-Oedenrode as capital of Peelland prospers. In 1355 it joins a covenant of Brabant cities. The city acquired rights and because of the administrative function Sint-Oedenrode attracted new craftsmen, who were especially settling around the large oblong marketplace. Also the clergy and nobility built several castles and fortified farms in Sint-Oedenrode, which mainly served as country stays for various noble families of the Meierij. An important estate at that time was the "Hertog Jaaghuis" (Duke's hunting lodge), which is built on the site of the former castle. Its foundations were excavated in 2004.

Economic growth is reflected in the creation of various structures, such as the Knoptoren of the Sint Maarten's church in Eerschot in 1410, the foundation of the Sint Paulus Gasthuis in 1434 and the construction of a new choir at the Oda church in 1498. This chapter church was served by canons living in large private mansions. The chapter joined in 1505 the Brabants chapter covenant.

The booming economy of Sint-Oedenrode receives several blows during the 16th century. During the Guelderian Wars in 1542 Rode was plundered by the Guelder field marshal Maarten van Rossum and burned down, including the parish church.

The Dutch War of Independence caused more suffering:

- In 1572 State troops under the Duke of Holstein plundered the city.
- In 1576 the States occupier of Zaltbommel destroyed several houses in Rode.
- After which the States garrison of Heusden destroyed another hundred and ten houses in 1581.
- A disastrous year was 1583 when State troops under Baron of IJsselstein, after burning down the towns of Schijndel and Veghel, burnt down the entire city including the two churches on their passage. The people of Sint Michielsgestel, Gemonde, Heeswijk-Dinther, Erp, Veghel and Sint-Oedenrode had at the time already been given the order to thresh all the grain and bring it with peat and wood to Den Bosch, so it would not fall to the republic's hordes.
- In 1587 the city was again plundered by State troops under the Count of Hohenlohe.

The consecutive disasters in the late 16th century were devastating to the development of the city.

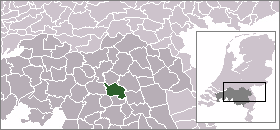
Location in North-Brabant

=== Staats-Brabant ===
Since 1648 is Sint-Oedenrode part of the Republic of the Seven United Netherlands, since the Bailiwick of 's-Hertogenbosch and its belongings are allocated to the States. Sint-Oedenrode experiences a time of stagnation. Under the Staats-Brabant the city functions as a military buffer zone for the province of Holland during which time it has little to no opportunities for economic growth. In this era there are several castles and farmhouses that dilapidated or are even completely deserted. Catholic worship is forbidden, the churches closed and Saint Martin's church in Eerschot is assigned to a handful of Protestant officials. From 1649 on for several years will the people of Sint-Oedenrode be using a clandestine church in a barn in Veghel near the hamlet Duifhuis. That church was in use by the parishioners of Sint-Oedenrode, Schijndel and Veghel until the French invasion of 1672.

=== French period and Kingdom of the Netherlands ===
The French led by General Pichegru invade Sint-Oedenrode in 1794. The French came from the direction of Boxtel towards Sint-Oedenrode, that at that time was occupied by British troops. The British destroyed the bridges over the Dommel. Between Sint-Oedenrode and Veghel a battle took place between French and allied troops. In 1795 Sint-Oedenrode becomes a full member of the Batavian Republic. In 1809 King Louis Napoleon visites the city.

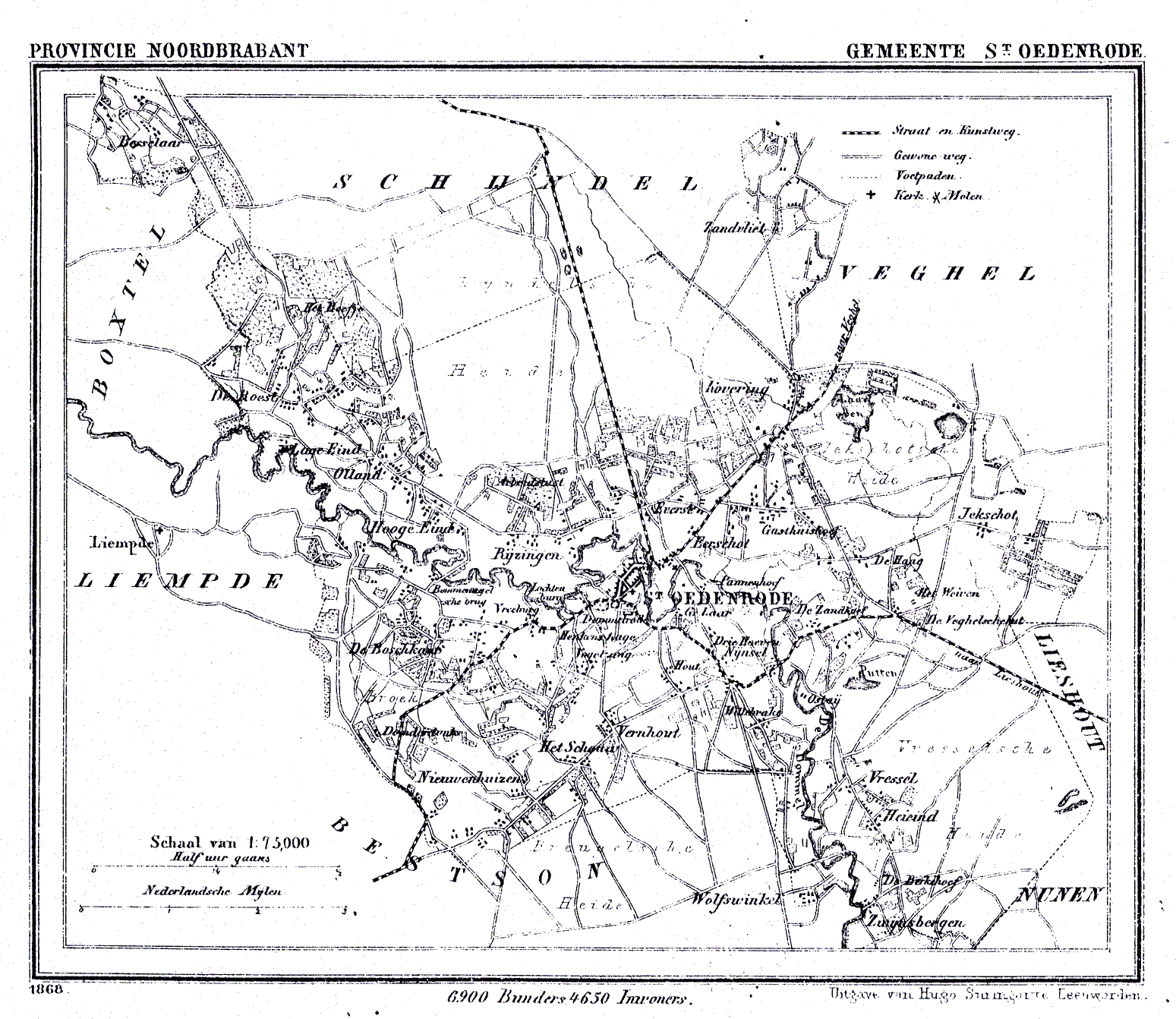
Sint-Oedenrode in 1868

=== World War II ===
During the Second World War Sint-Oedenrode suffered tremendously. In May 1940 the German Army invaded the Low Countries and France, and due to the retreat from the Peel-Raam Line by the Dutch Armed Forces skirmishes arouse in Sint-Oedenrode in an attempt to keep the enemy at bay. After the capitulation (15 May 1940, in Zeeland 2 days later) Sint-Oedenrode found itself under German occupation. There was a small German Luftwaffe detachment of about 15 people providing a manned look-out (just like the Royal Observer Corps) for Allied planes which were undertaking operations against the Air Bases of Volkel and Eindhoven (Airbase Welschap, now Eindhoven Air Base).

During the final months of occupation the mayor (appointed by the Queen Wilhelmina of the Netherlands) was sacked and replaced by a pro-German mayor. The reasons for the sacking were that the central Distribution Office was plundered from blank distribution cards that were necessary to get coupons for males who were hiding from the Arbeitseinsatz (compulsory labour in the German war industry) and were using fake names. Also the mayor tried to sabotage the Arbeitseinsatz.

With the beginning of Operation Market Garden in 1944, Sint-Oedenrode was situated on an important location between the Allied landing zones in Son and Veghel. General Eisenhower and Field Marshal Montgomery had the important task of keep the corridor (which ran through Sint-Oedenrode) open for the passage of the British 30th Corps to conquer Nijmegen.

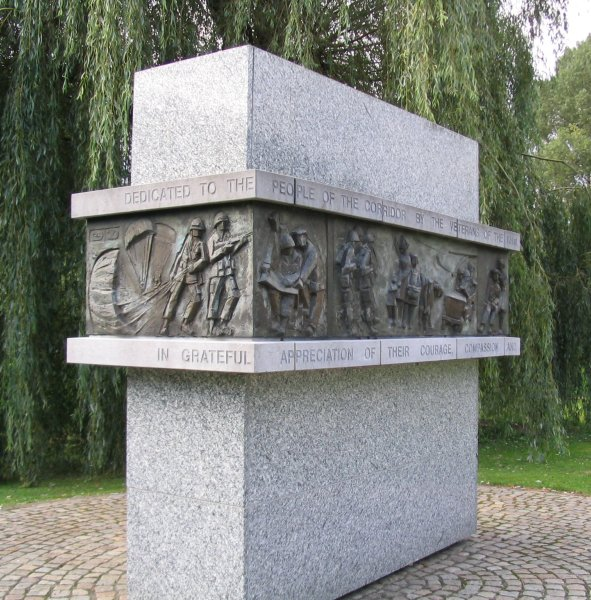
Monument to the Dutch

In September 1944 the liberation of Sint-Oedenrode came during Operation Market-Garden envisaged by Field Marshal Bernard Law Montgomery. The US 101st Airborne Division liberated the Town of Sint-Oedenrode (the 'Market' part) after para droppings in the fields in the vicinity. They were followed by the British XXX Army Corps (the 'Garden' part). For a brief time the 18th-century castle Henkenshage was used as allied HQ.

The British left 150 comrades behind, the Americans 125. Twenty-two British soldiers are buried at the General Cemetery in Sint-Oedenrode. Most of the British are reburied at the Uden War Cemetery and some did find their final resting place in Mierlo. The Americans who were originally buried in Wolfswinkel (Son en Breugel) are reburied in Margraten or the US.

On September 16, 1994 101st Airborne veterans revealed a war monument 'Monument for the Dutch'. The monument is a gift from the veterans to the civilians who fought alongside of the US troops, much to surprise and relief of the US soldiers. The inscription on the monument is in English and reads "Dedicated to the people of the Corridor by the veterans of the 101st Airborne Division, in grateful appreciation of their courage, compassion and friendship". The monument can be found alongside the road 'Corridor' which was constructed after the war between key points of the actual Corridor: the allied supply route from Eindhoven to Nijmegen.

=== Post-war era ===
In the twentieth century mainly the growth of N.V. ODA Steel Works and Ovenbouw v/h H.J. van de Kamp, later N.V. ODA Steel Furniture (now part of the multinational Ahrend) created employment in Sint-Oedenrode. Sint-Oedenrode is regularly erroneously referred to as rural municipality. As a former market city the urbanization had already begun at the end of the 19th and early 20th centuries. The excessive urbanization is evident from the fact that in 1930 already more than half of the population was not engaged in agriculture. After neighboring municipalities Schijndel and Veghel, Sint-Oedenrode was at the time the third most industrialized town of eastern North-Brabant. Around 1950 Sint-Oedenrode lost its third place to Uden, which began to develop quickly after it was designated as a core congregation. In 1956 only 30% of the inhabitants of Sint-Oedenrode was involved in agriculture.

== Gallery ==
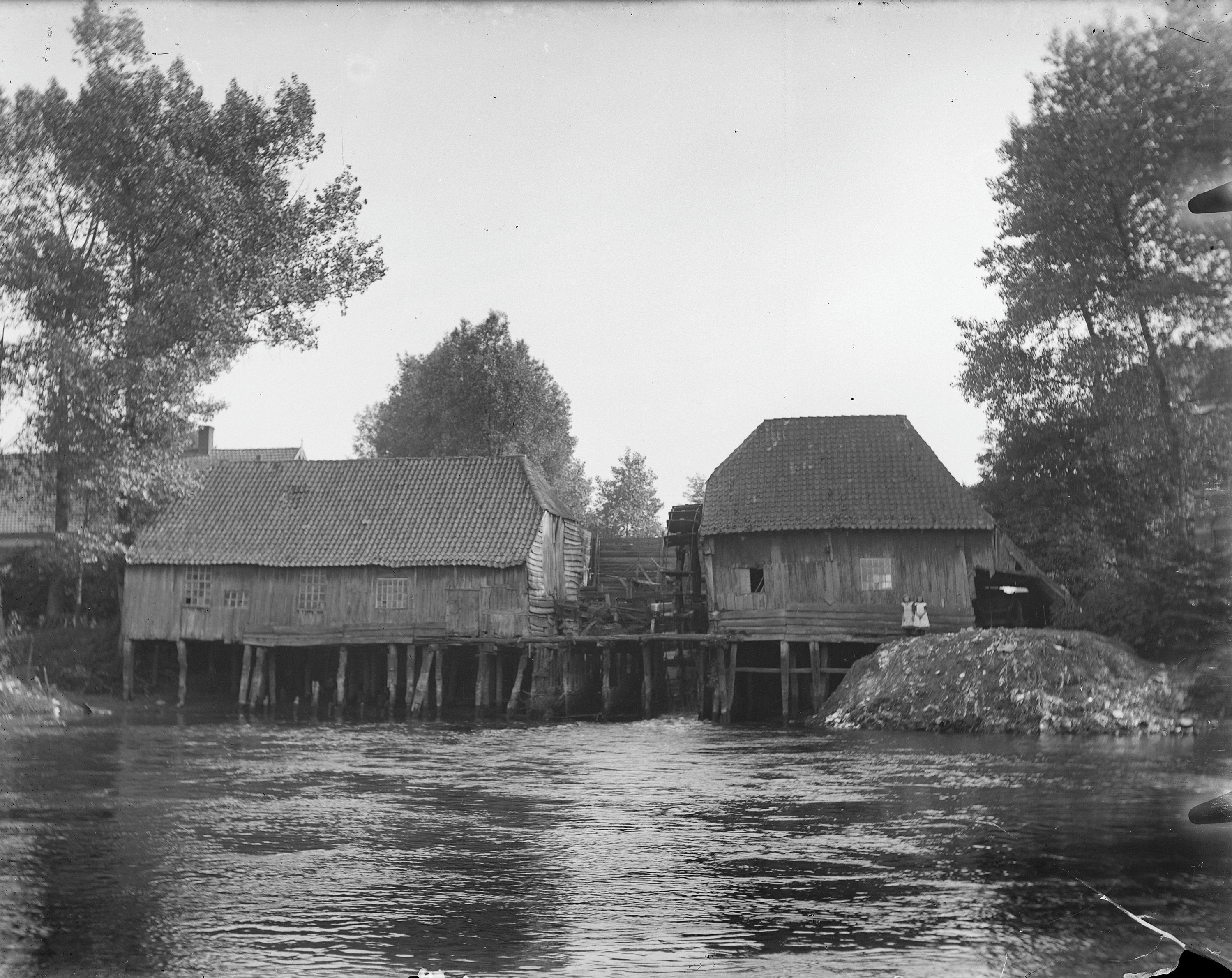
"Borchmolen" (Water mill) at the "Borchmolendijk"

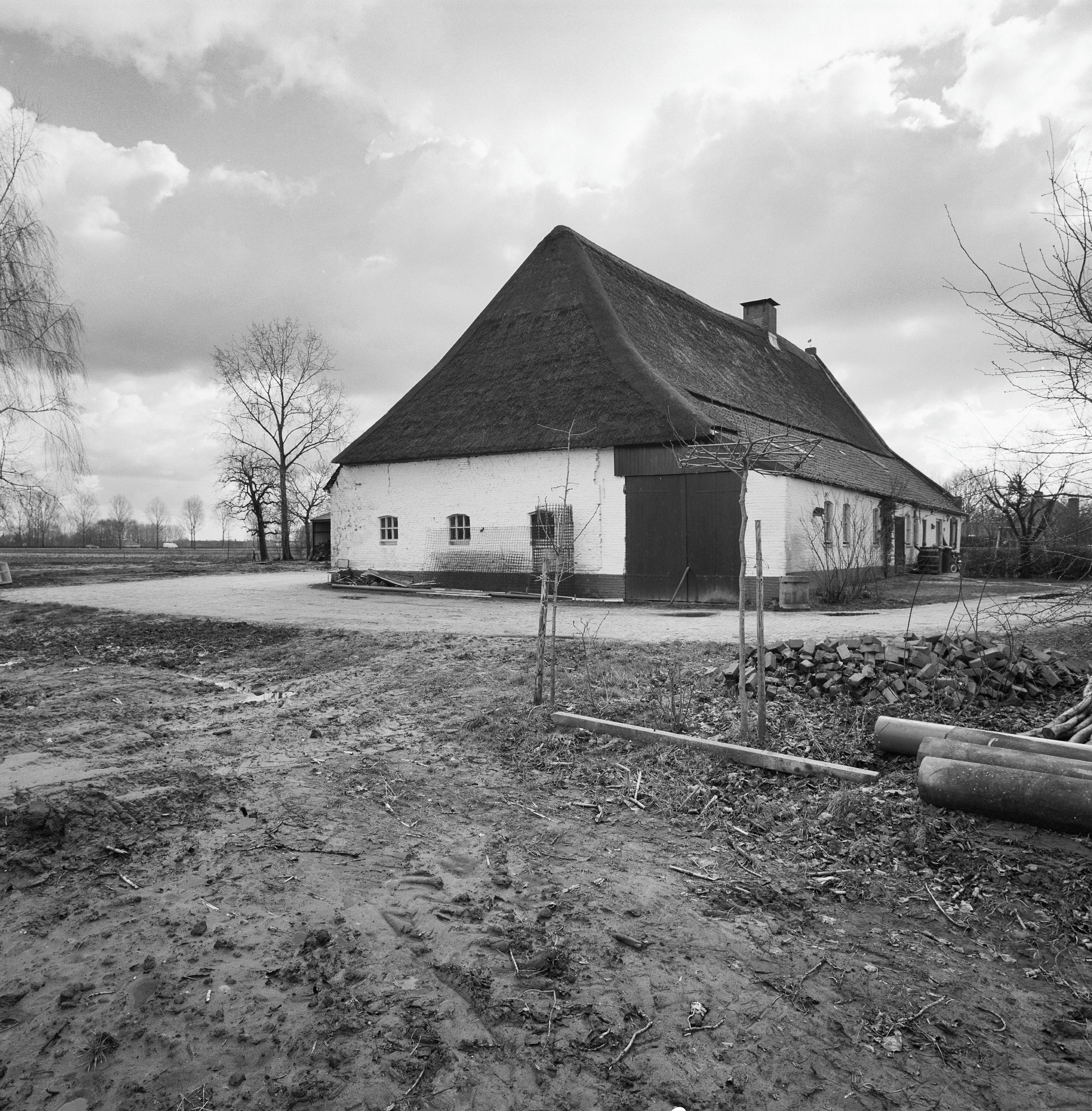
"De Grote Laar" as seen from the back, Nijnselseweg

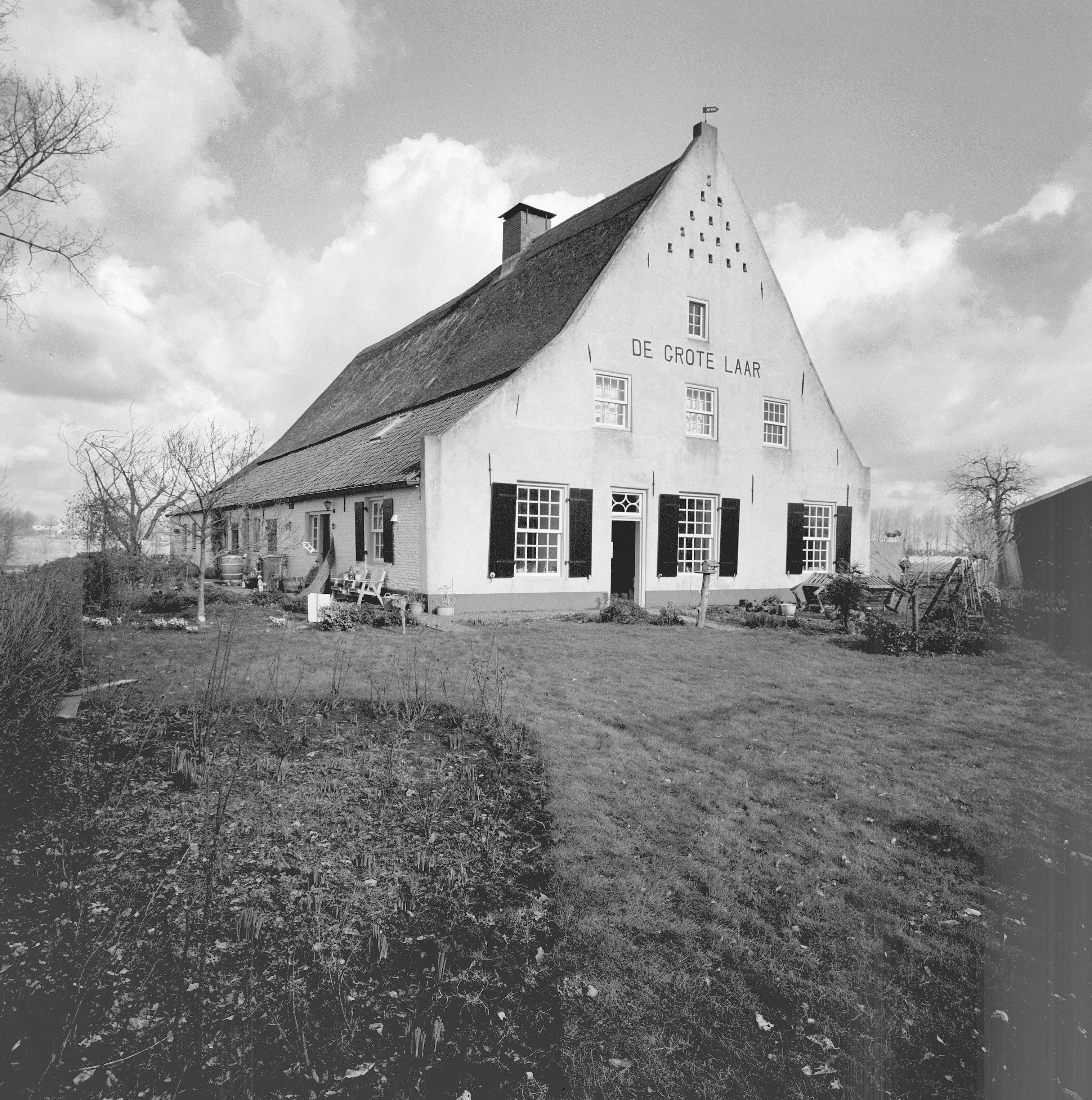
"De Grote Laar" as seen from the front, Nijnselseweg

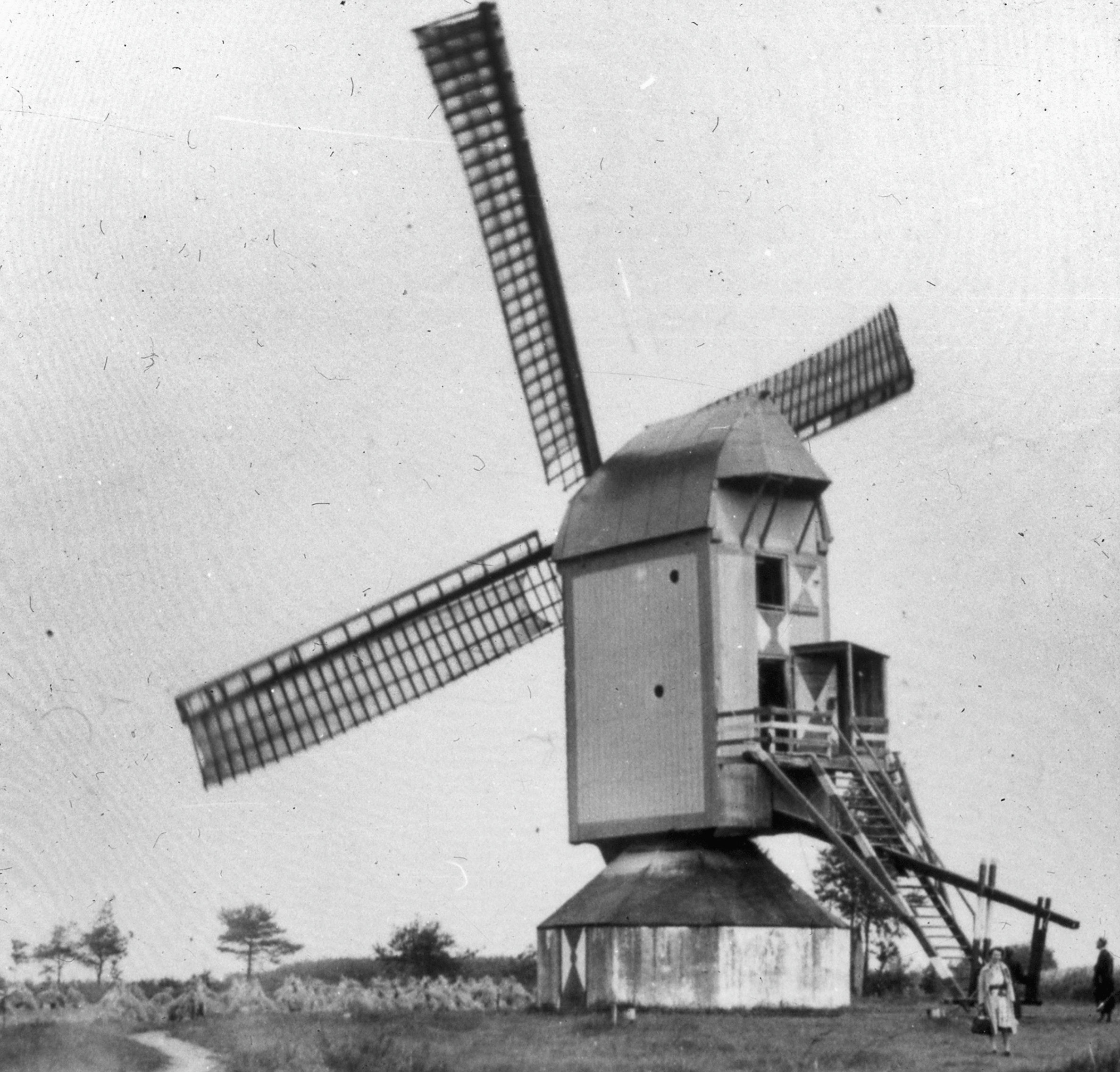
Mill "De Koevering" destroyed in 1944

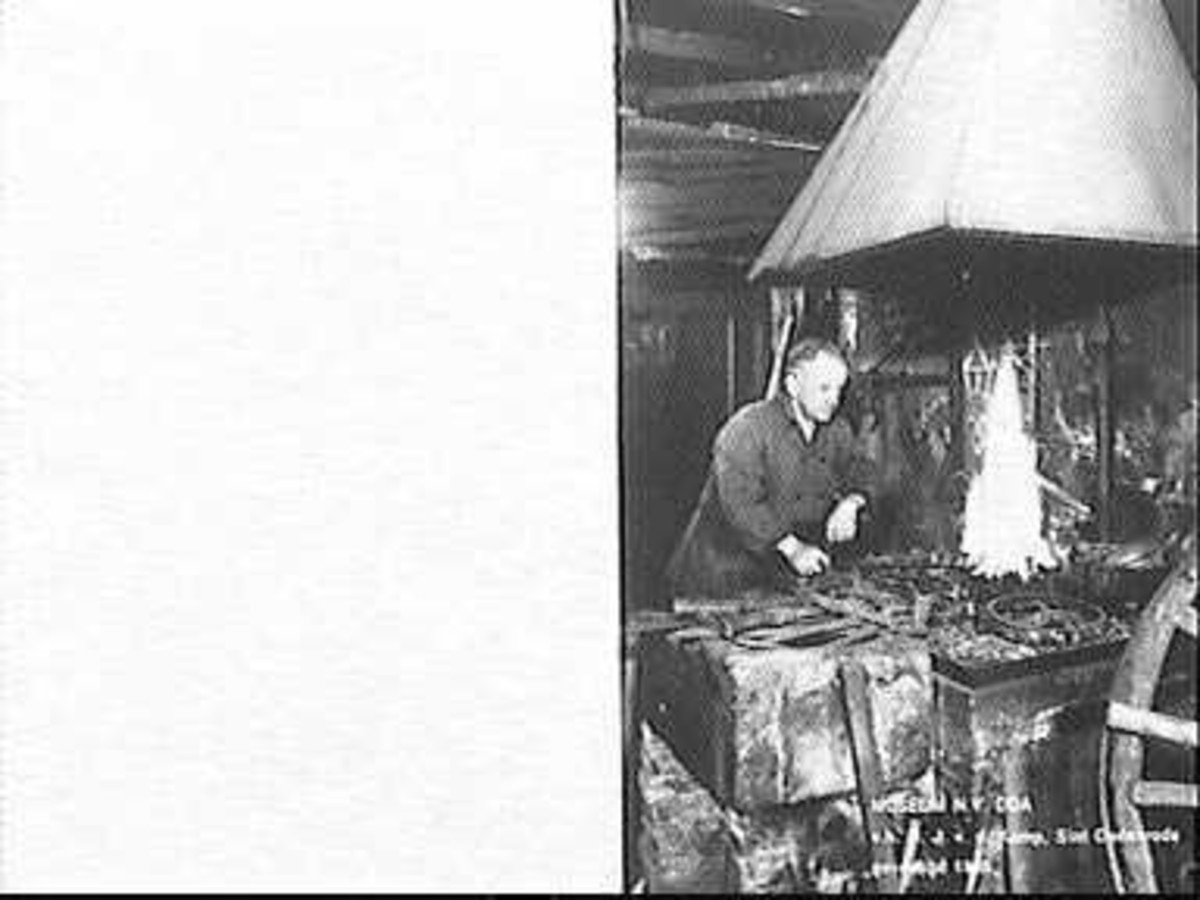
Forge, 1905

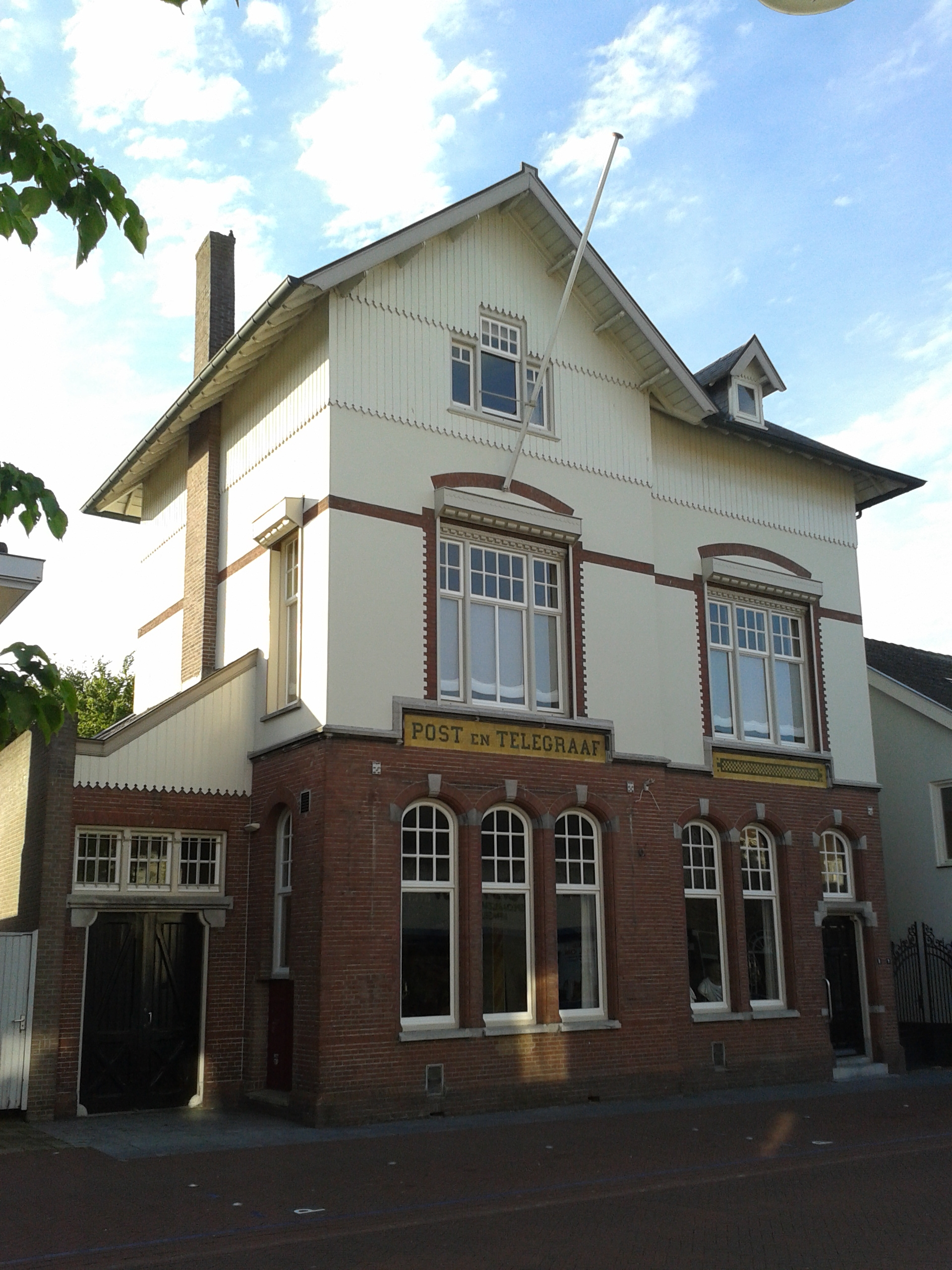
Old post office with staff residence, market square,

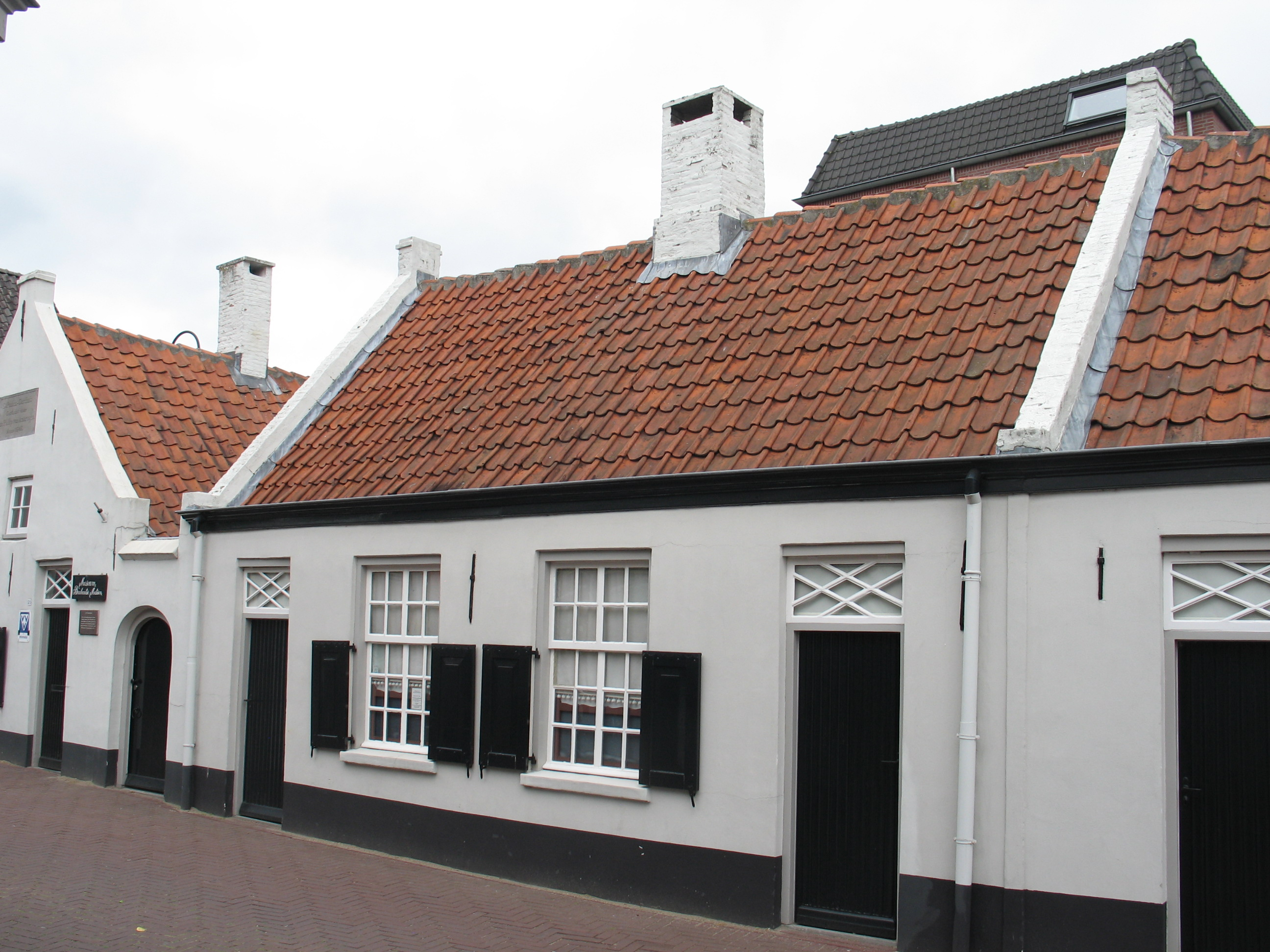
Sint Paulus Hospice, 1434, Sint-Oedenrode

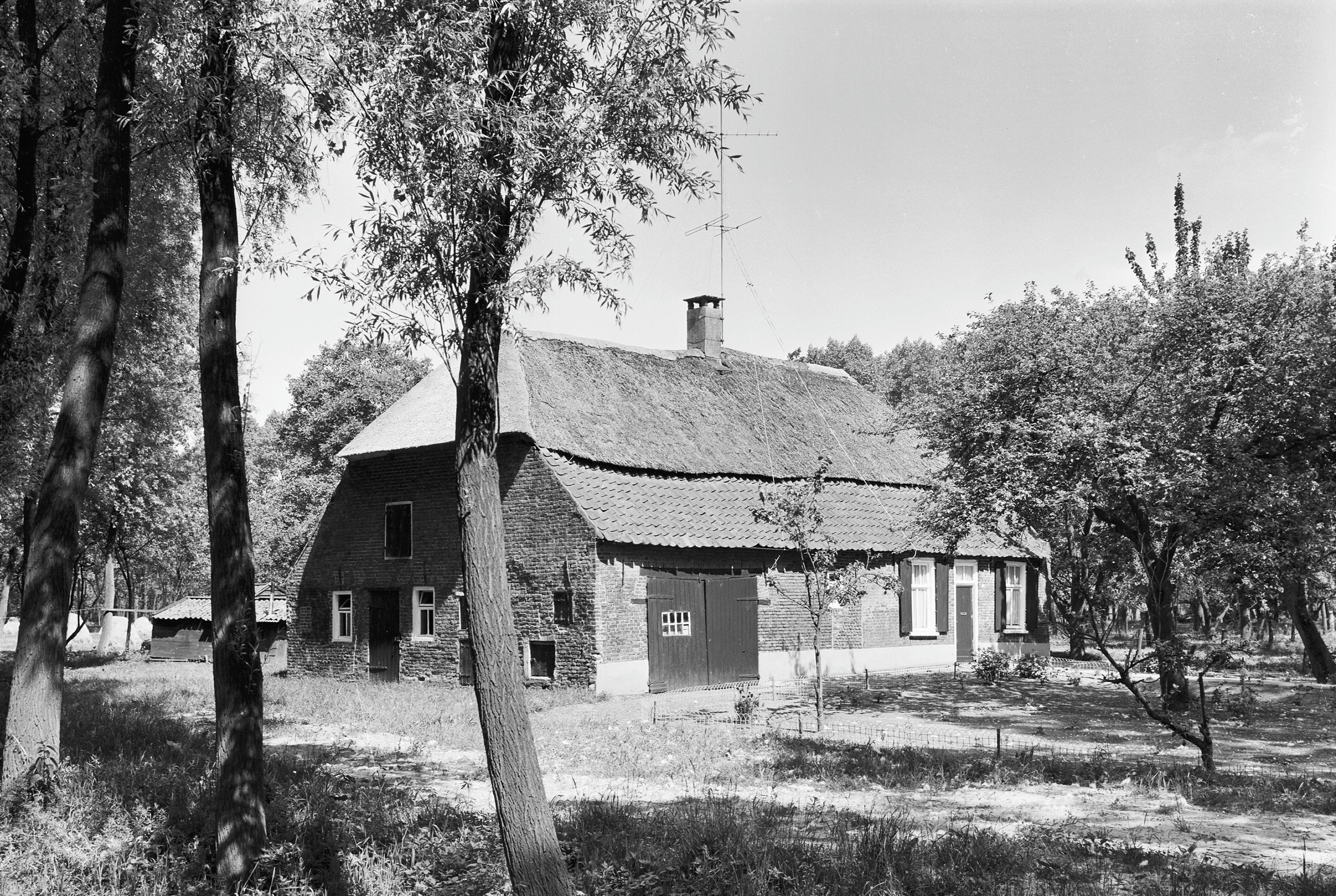
Farm House, Boskant 1968

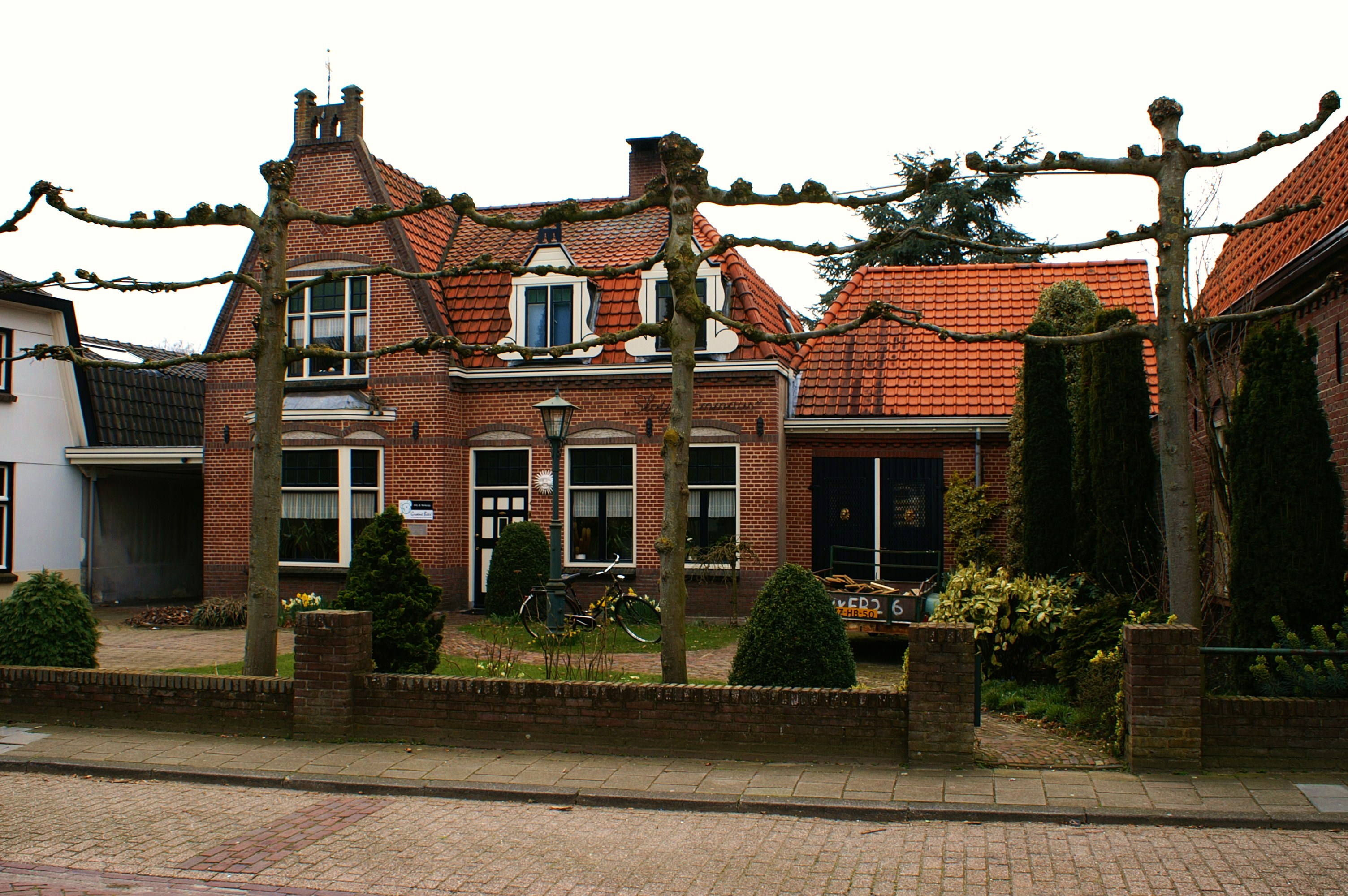
Emmaus House, Sint-Oedenrode

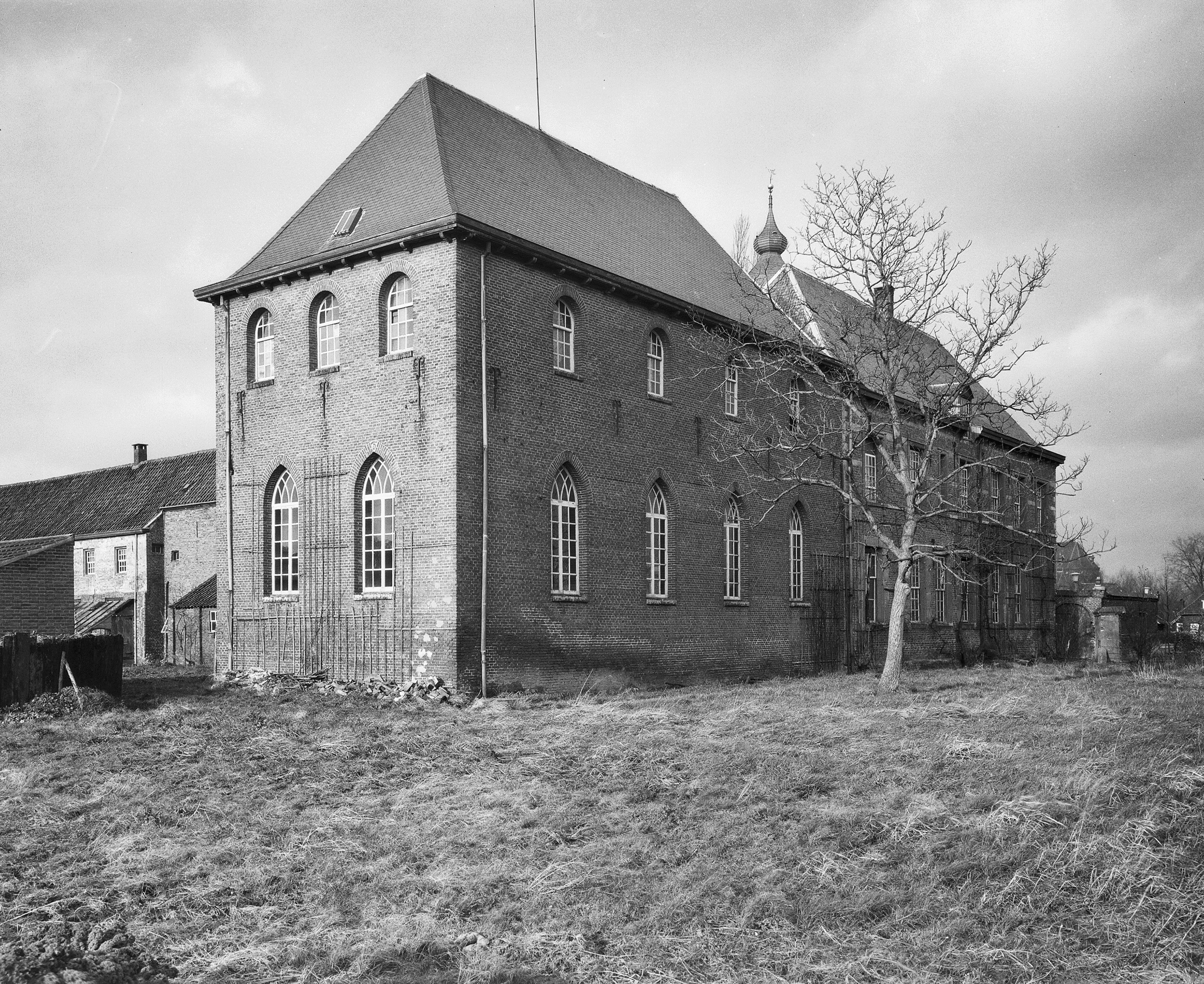
Castle Dommelrode, December 1960, before restoration

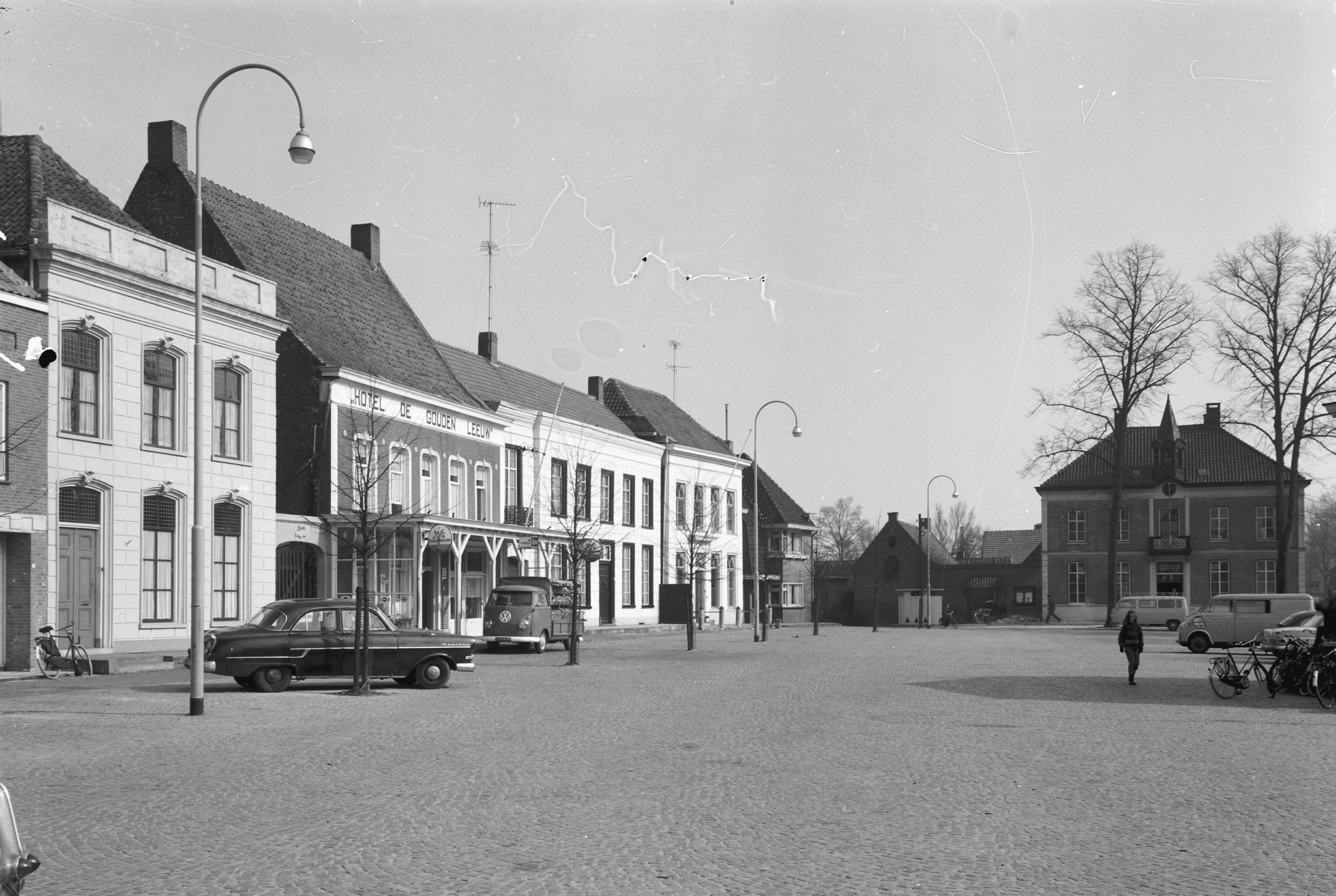
Northwest side of the market square, Sint-Oedenrode, March 1964

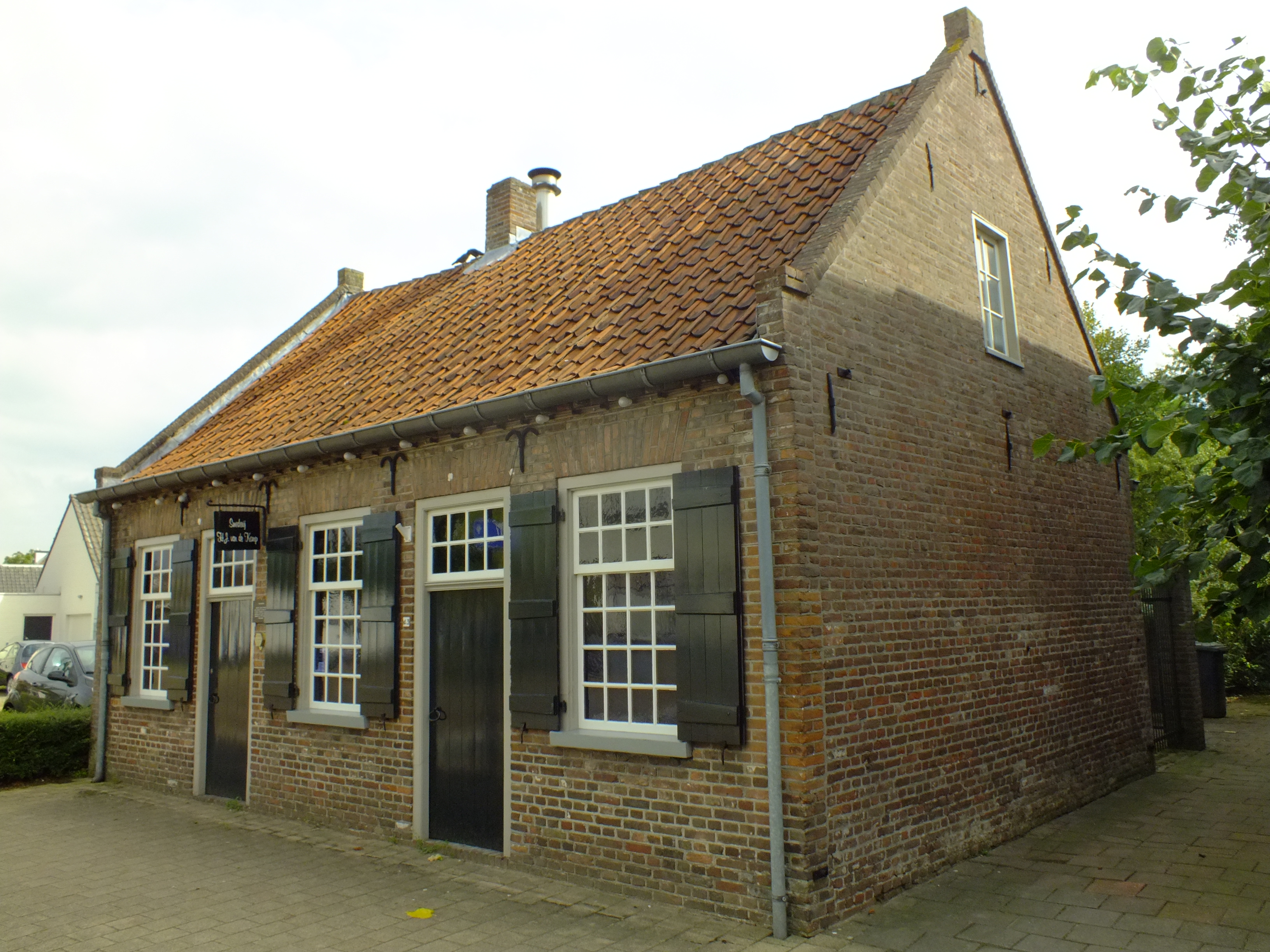
Old town house with forge, turned museum, at 't Kofferen, Sint-Oedenrode

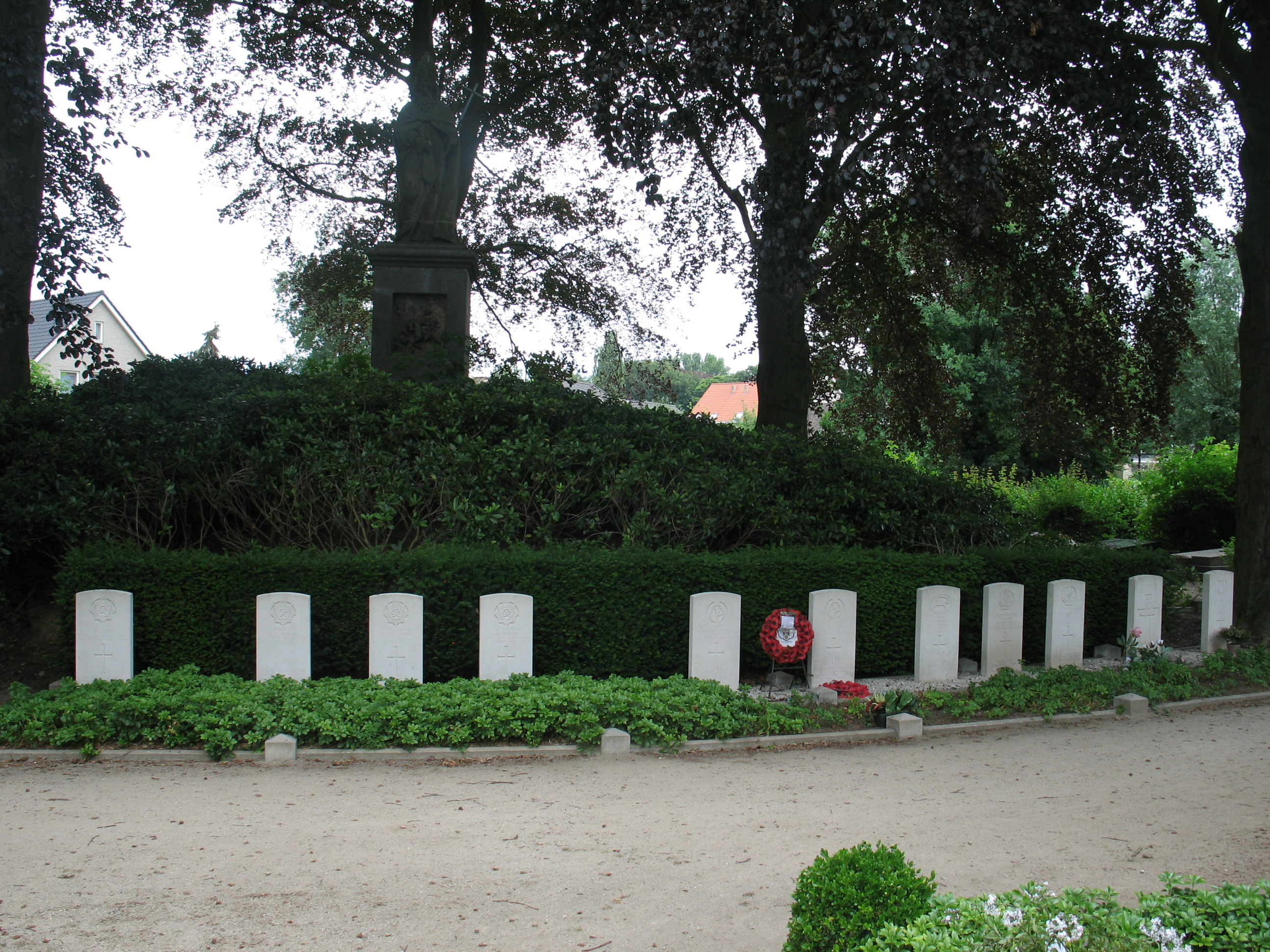
War graves in Sint-Oedenrode

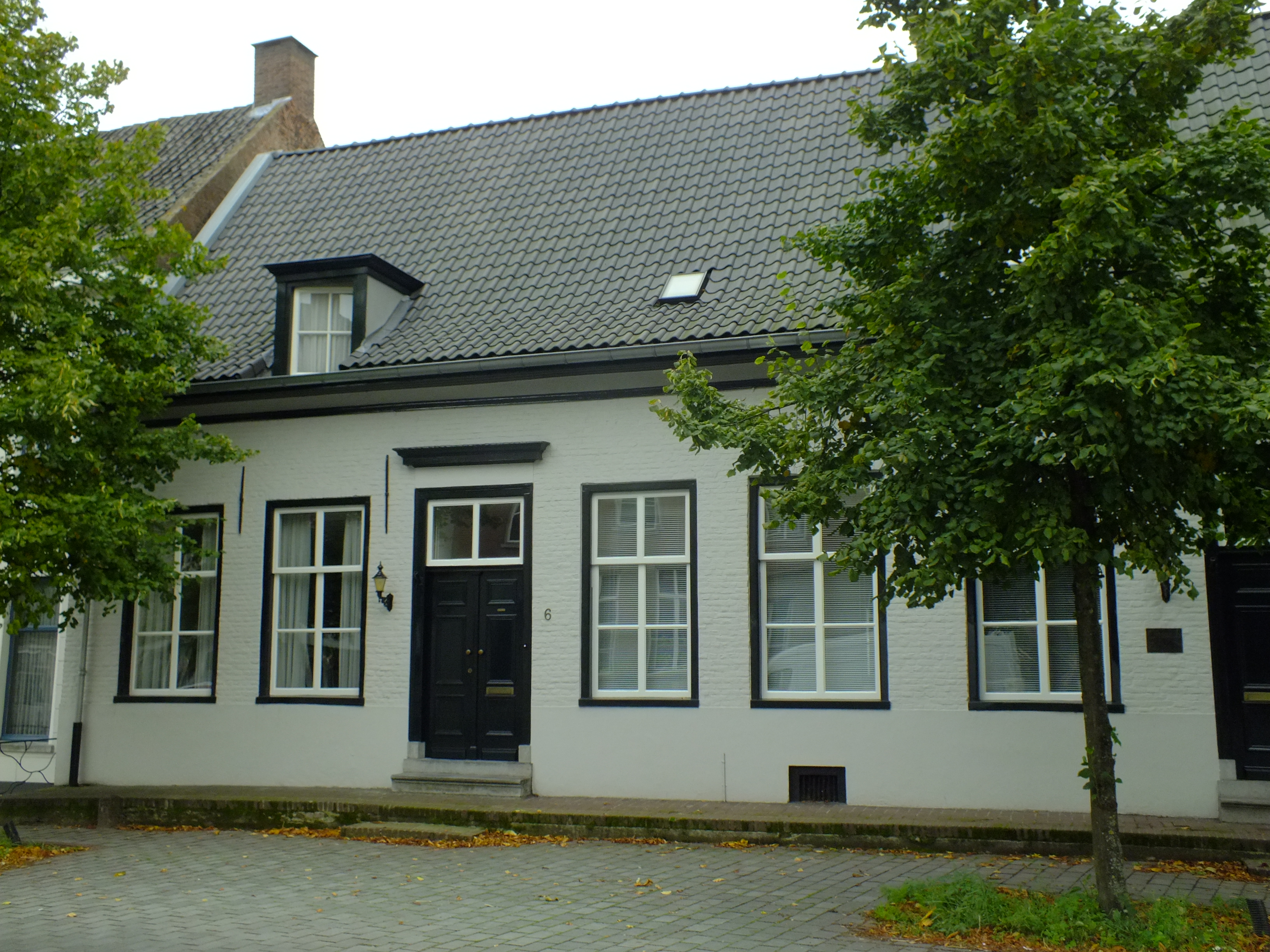
Old town house, Sint-Oedenrode

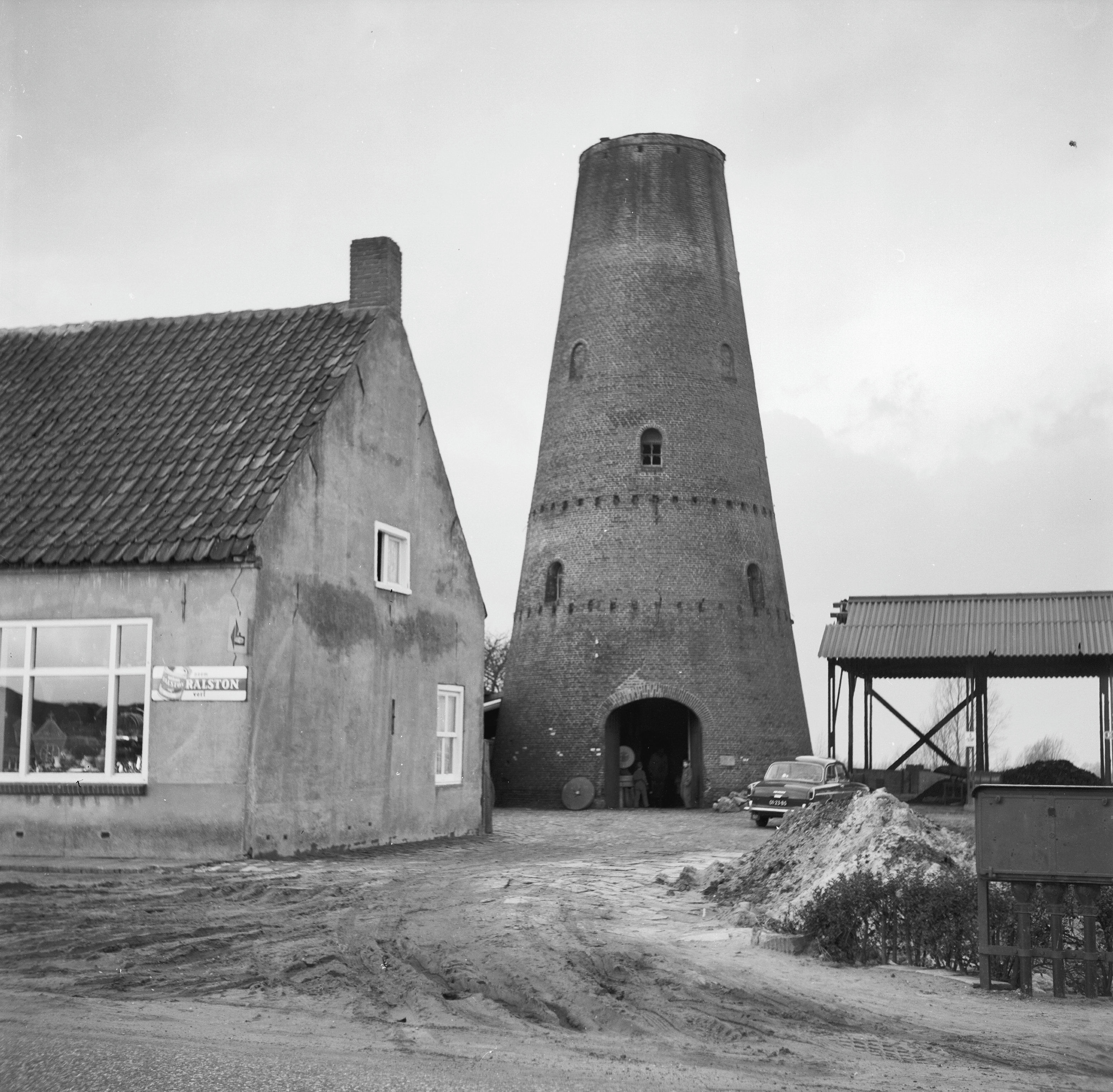
Former grain mill, burned down 1932. January 1968

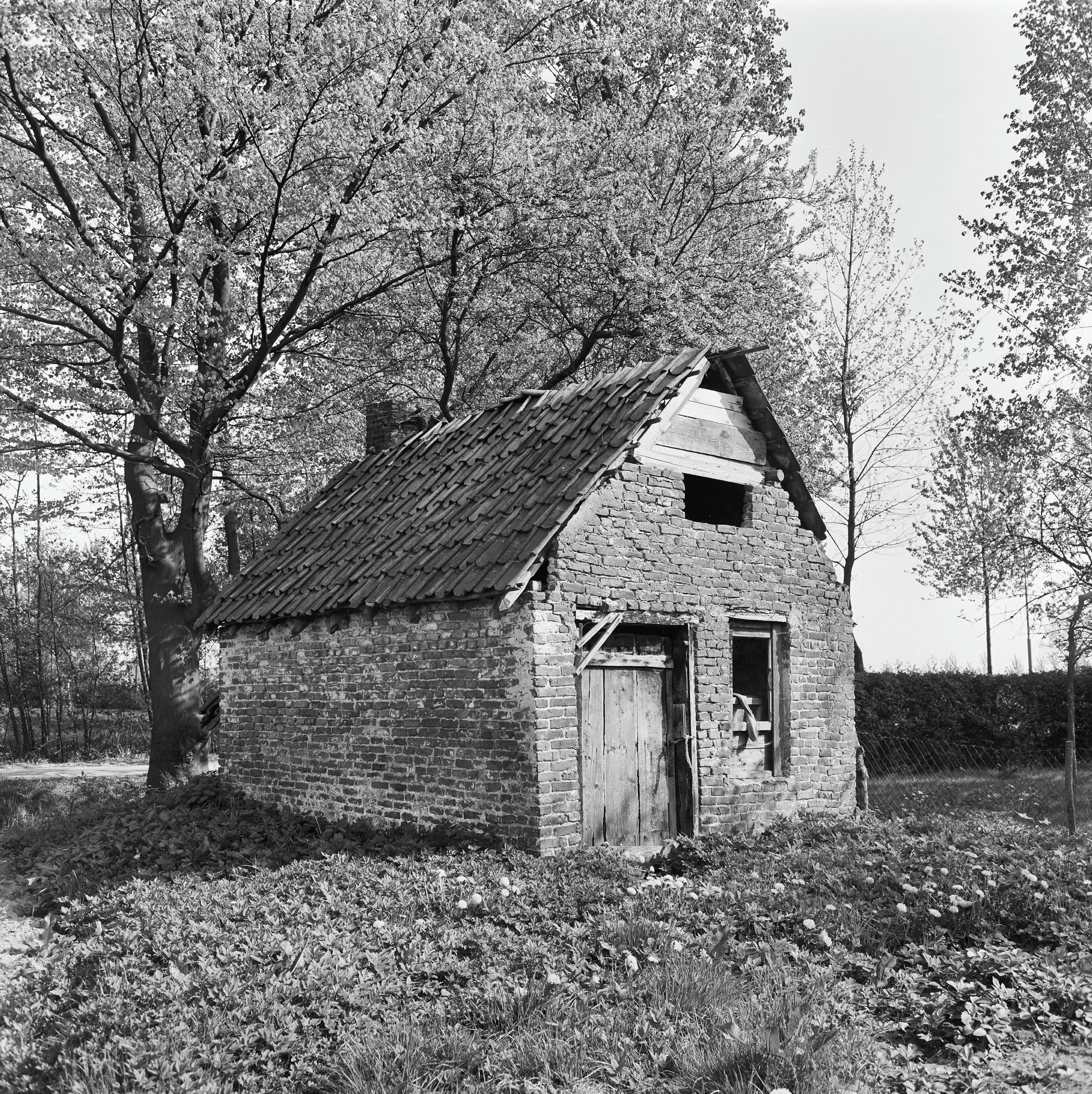
Old baking house, May 1970

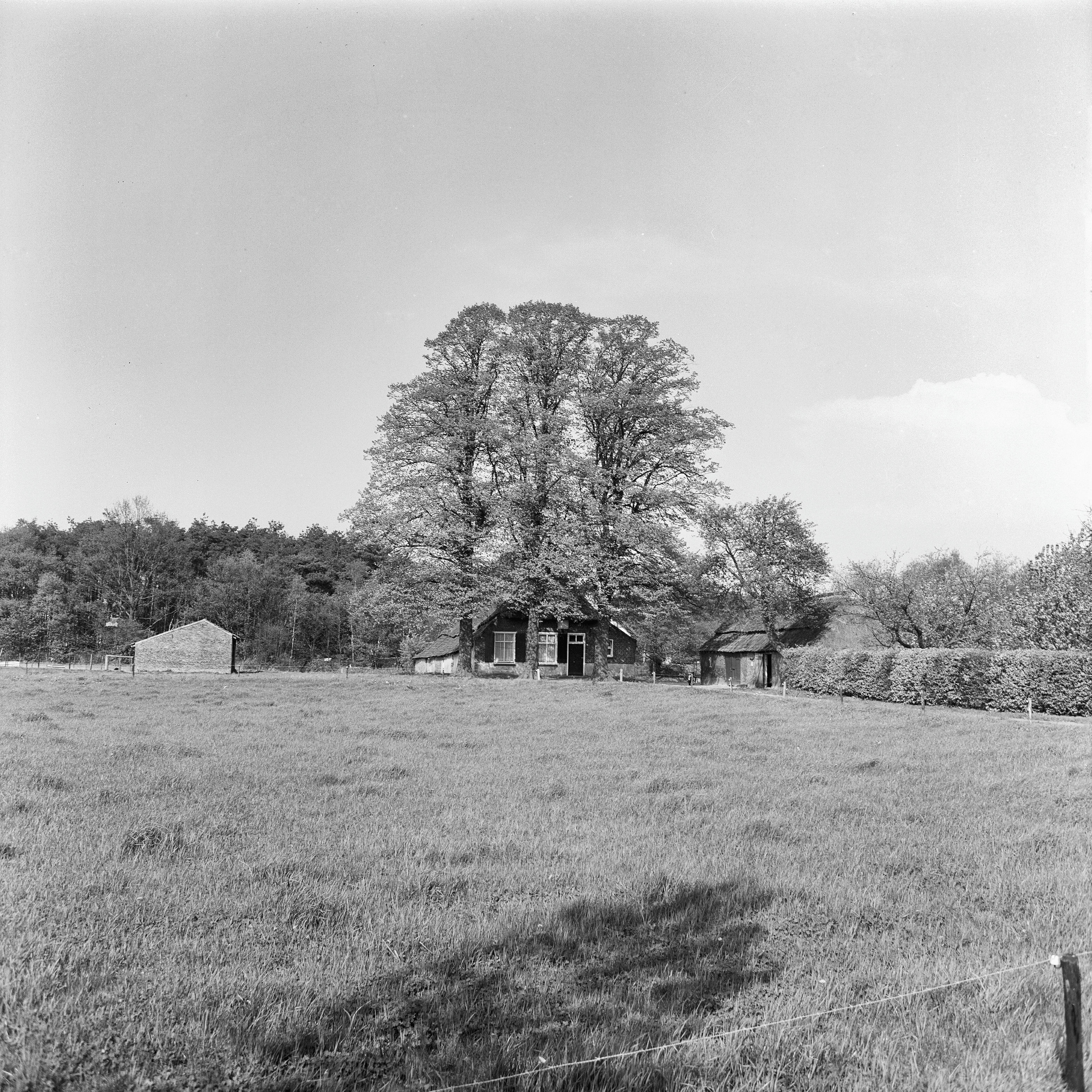
Farm house, Vresselse weg, May 1970

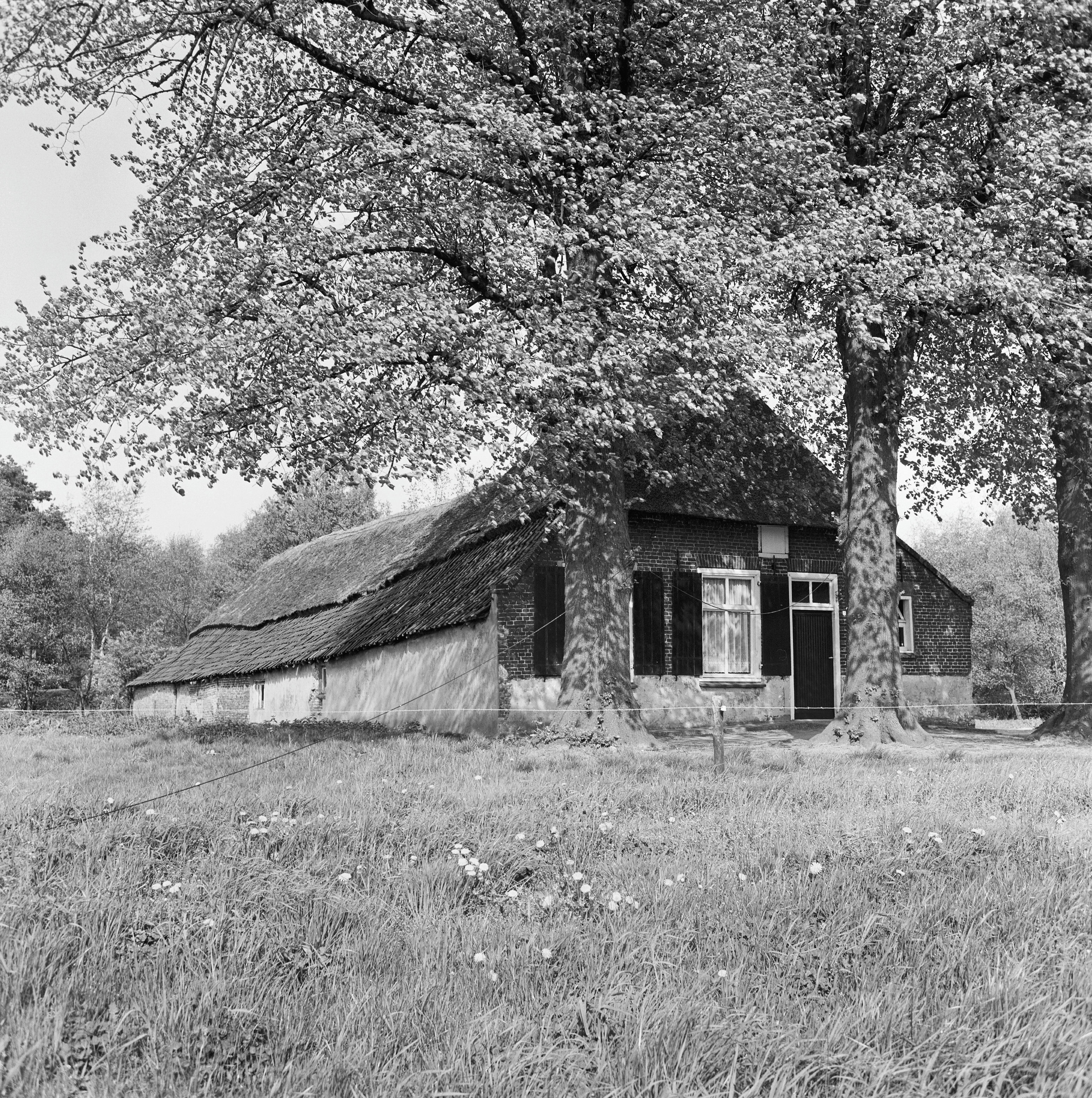
Farm house, Vresselse weg, May 1970

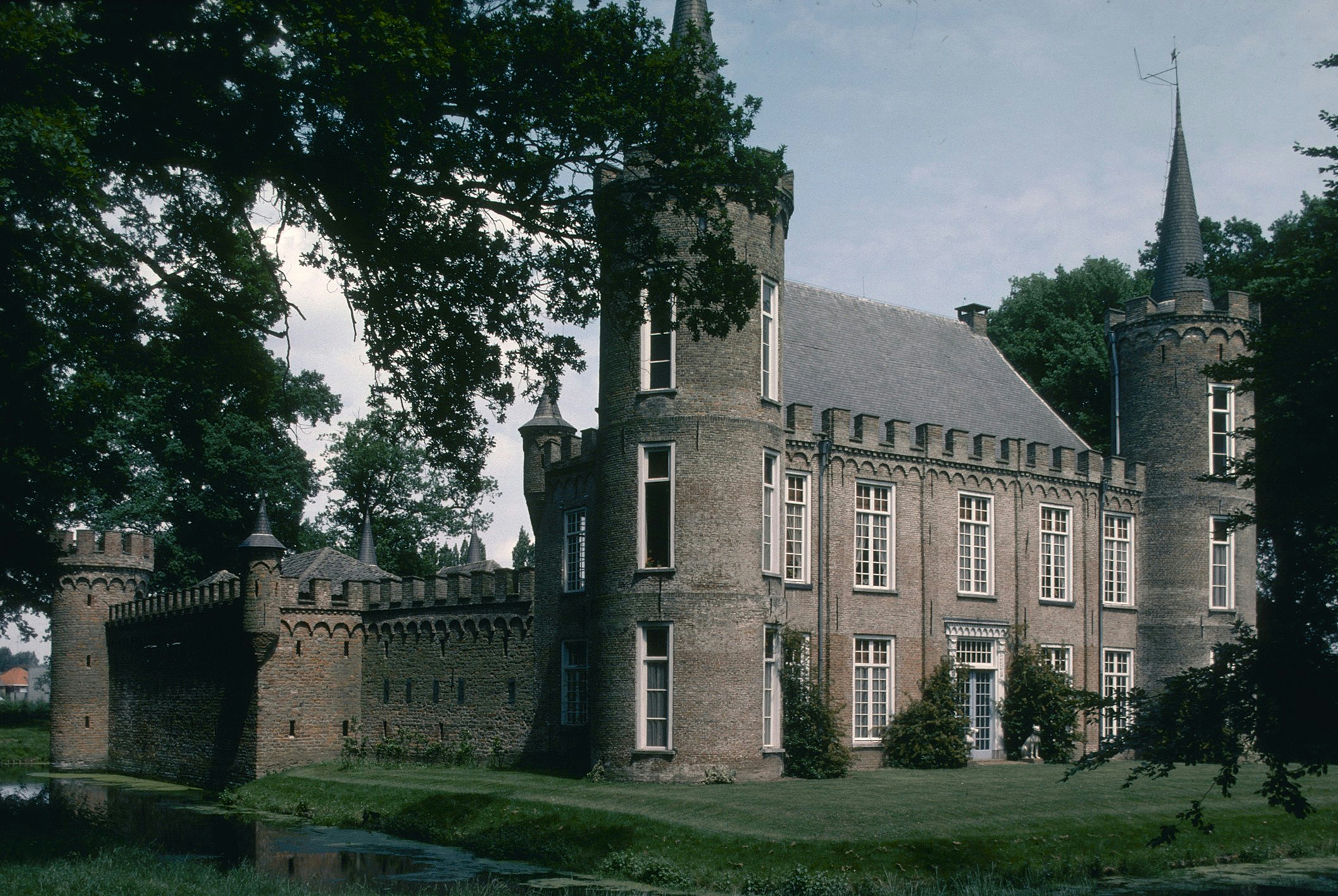
Castle Henkenshage, 1978

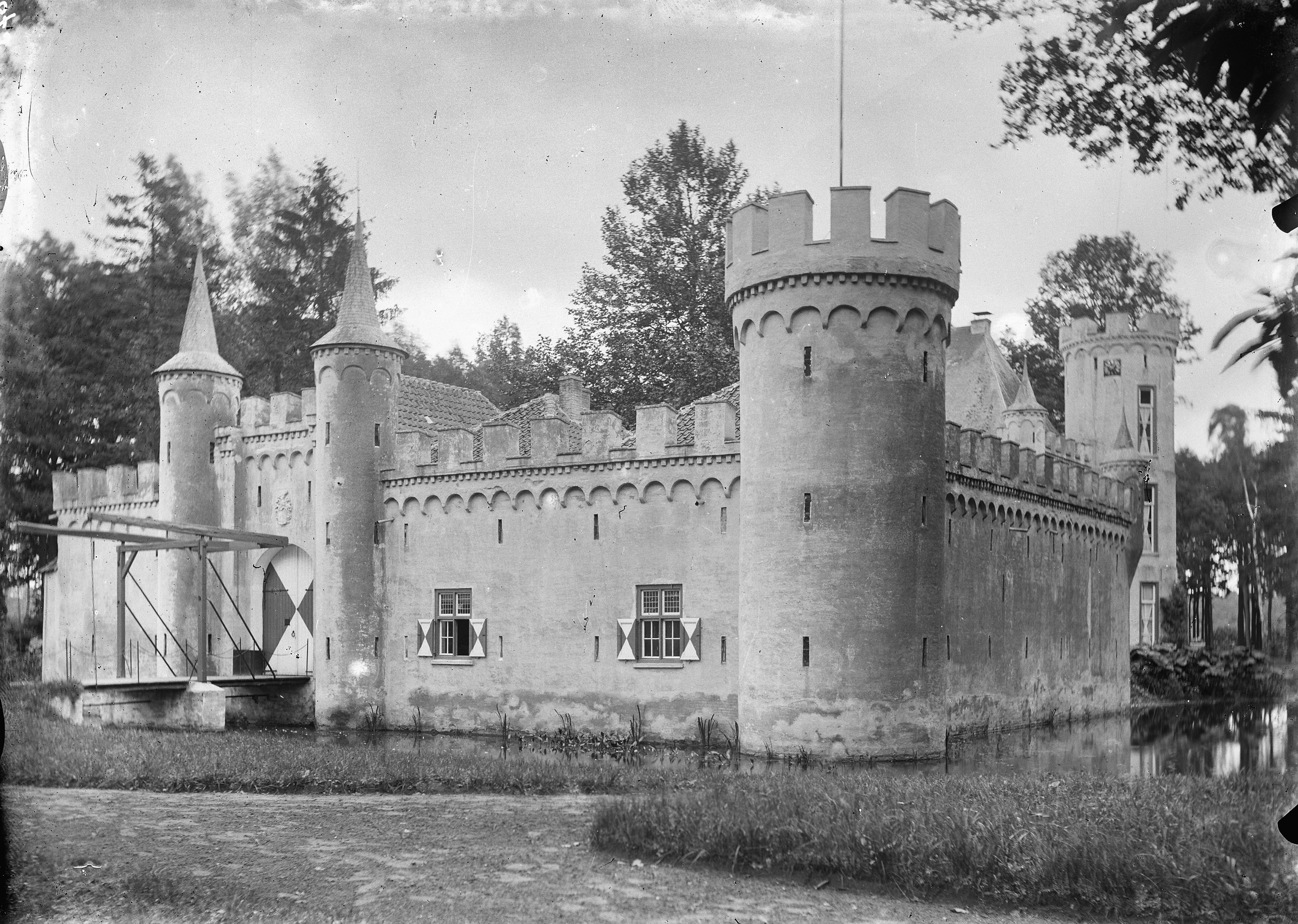
Castle Henkenshage

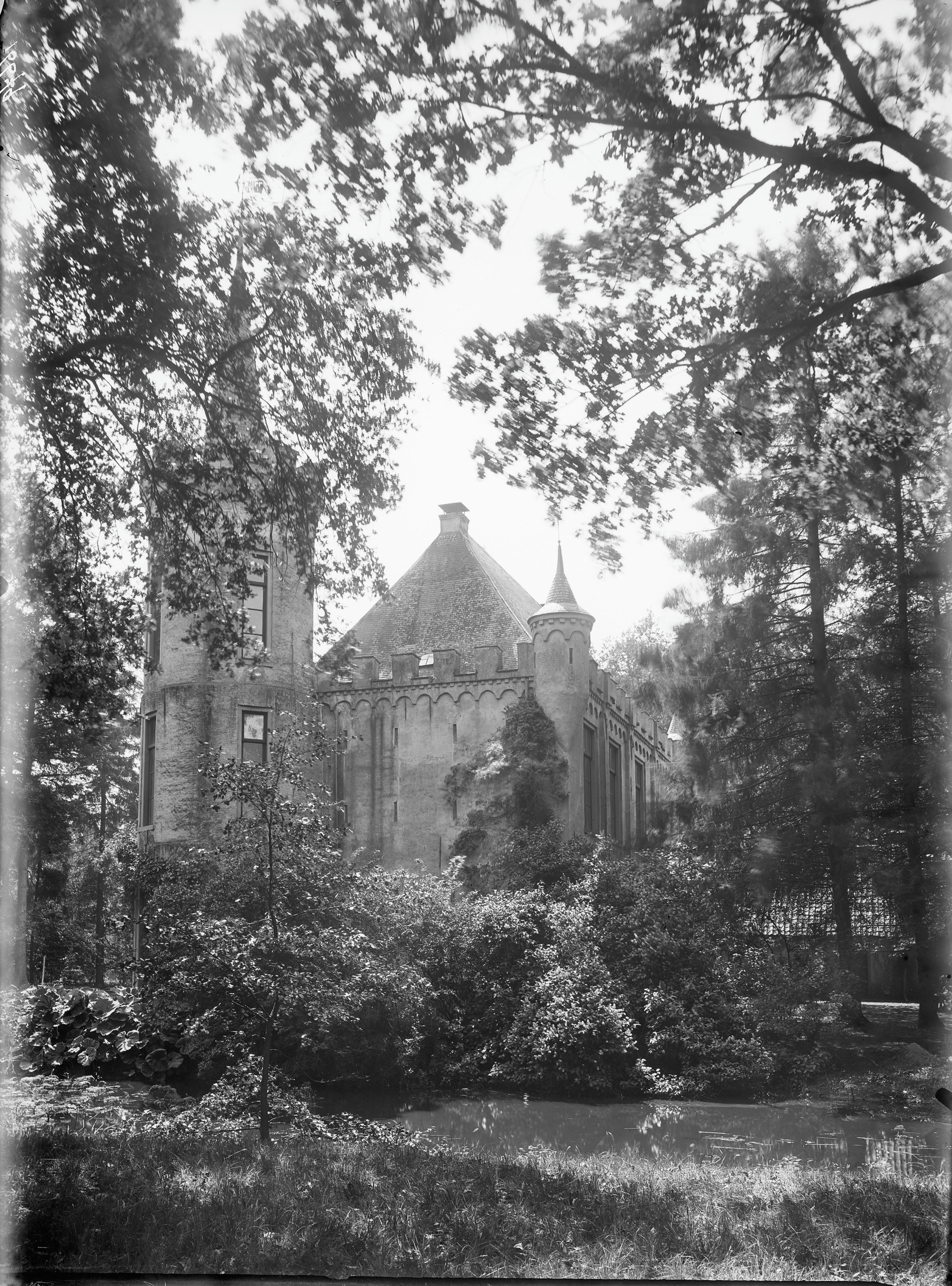
Castle Henkenshage, June 1905

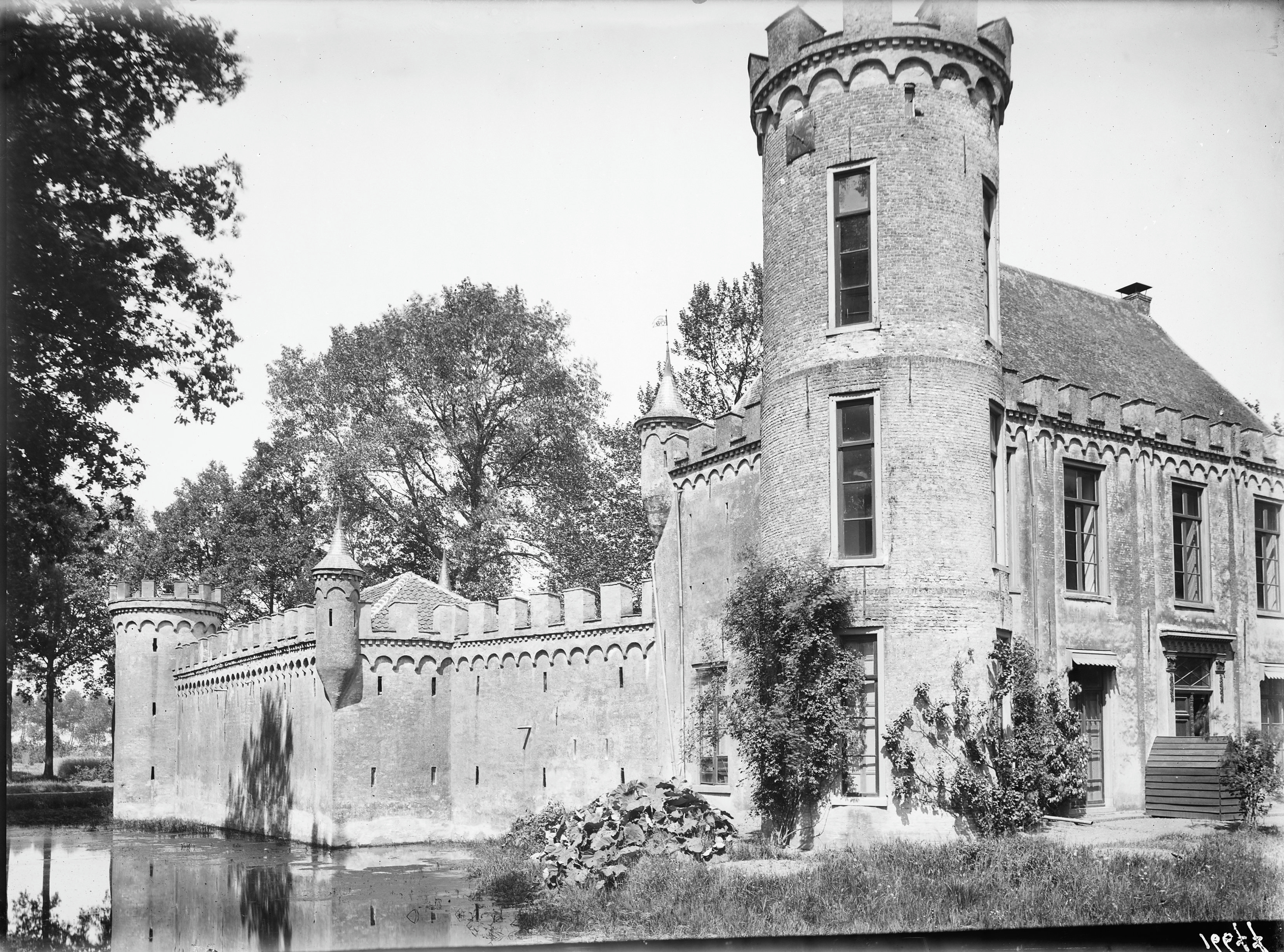
Castle Henkenshage, June 1905

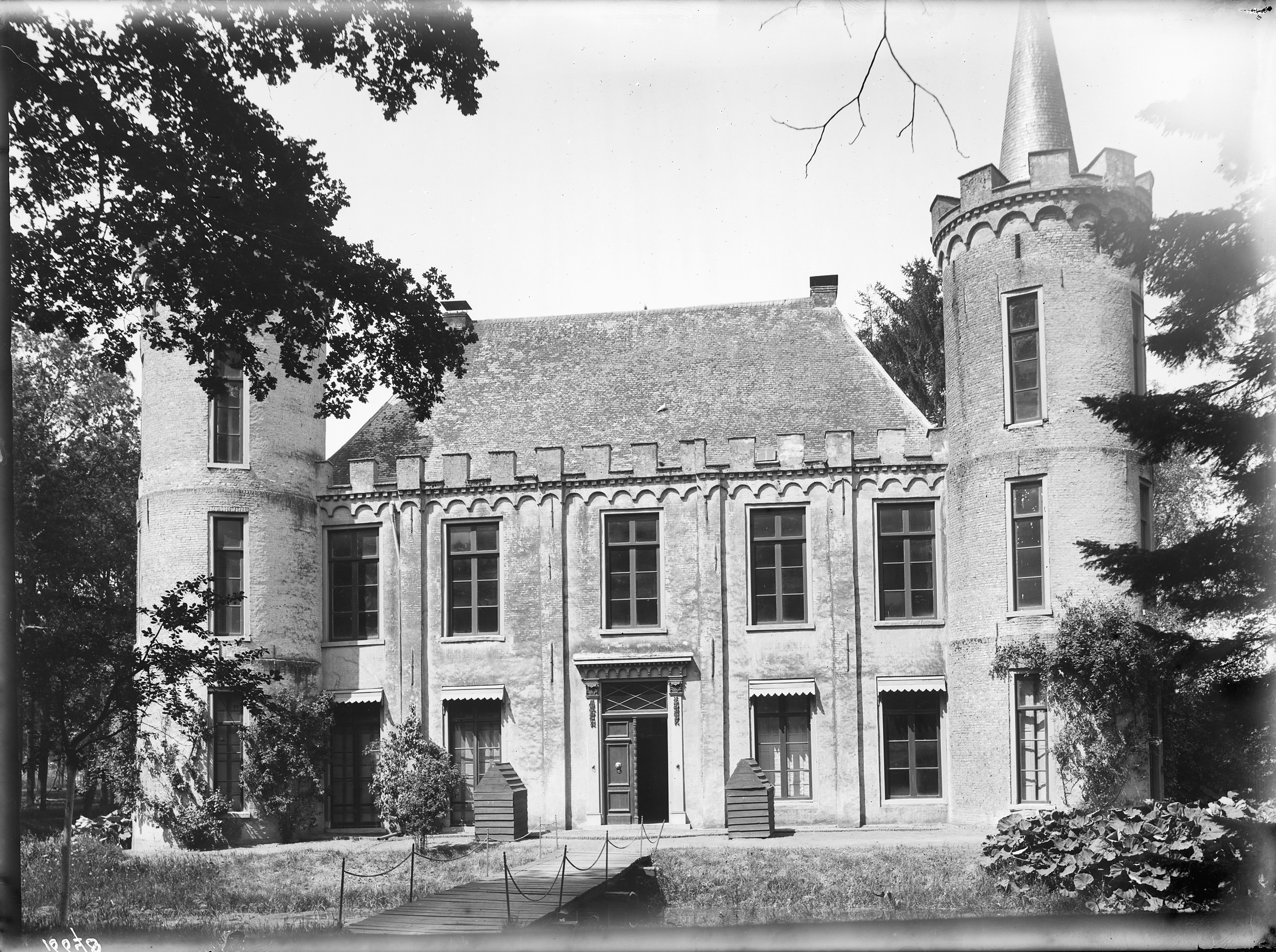
Castle Henkenshage, June 1905

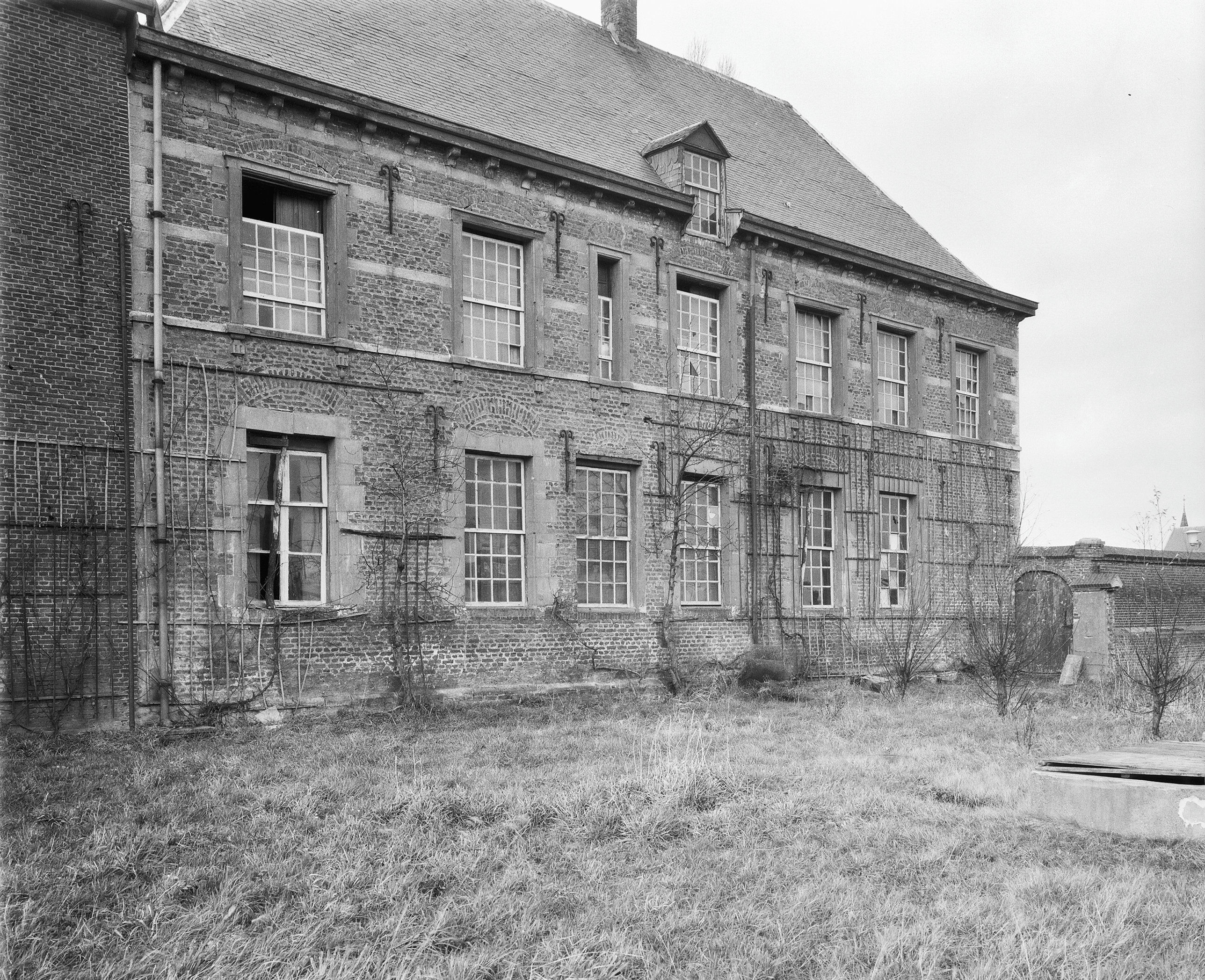
Castle "De Bocht" or "Dommelrode", December 1960

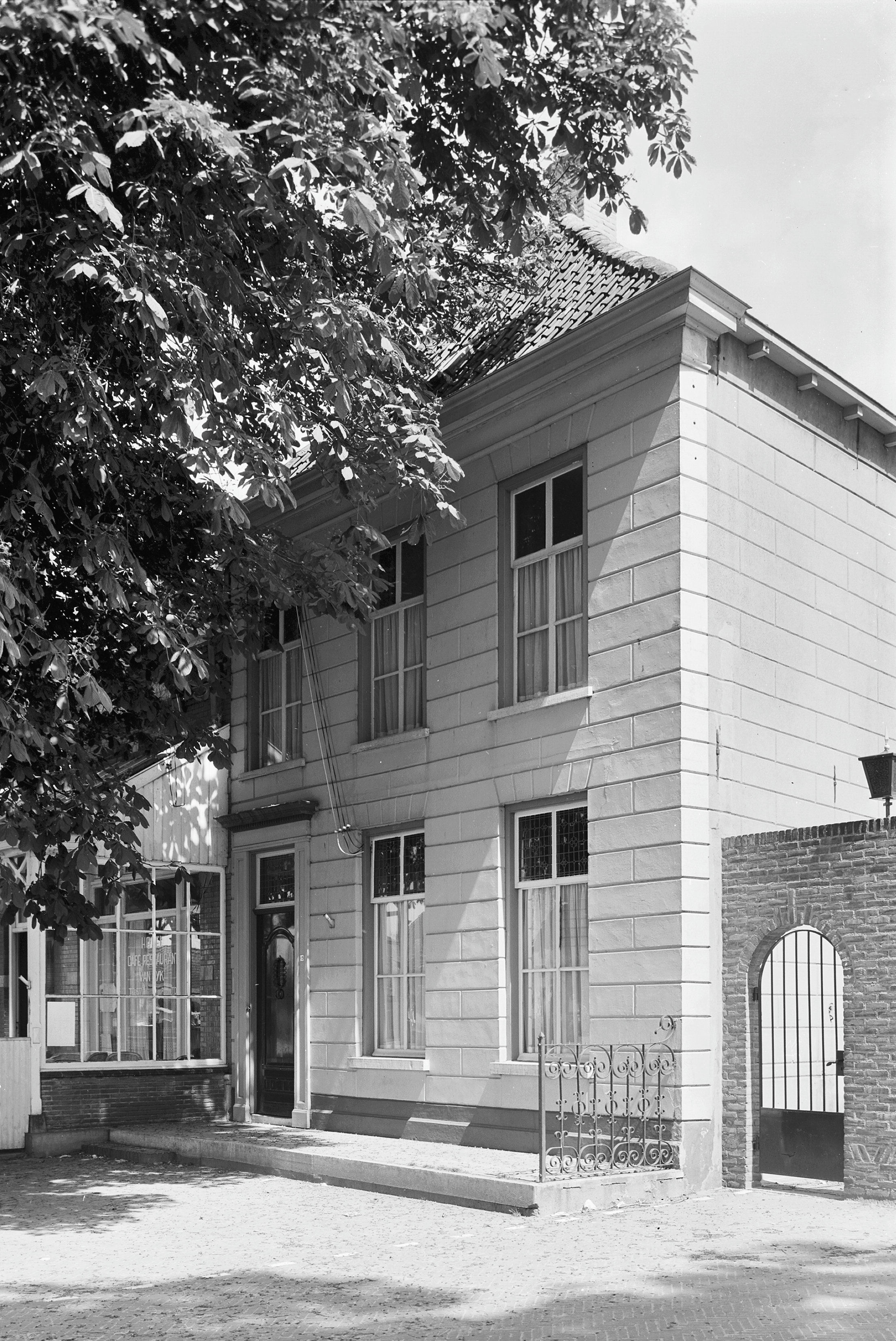
market square, June 1968

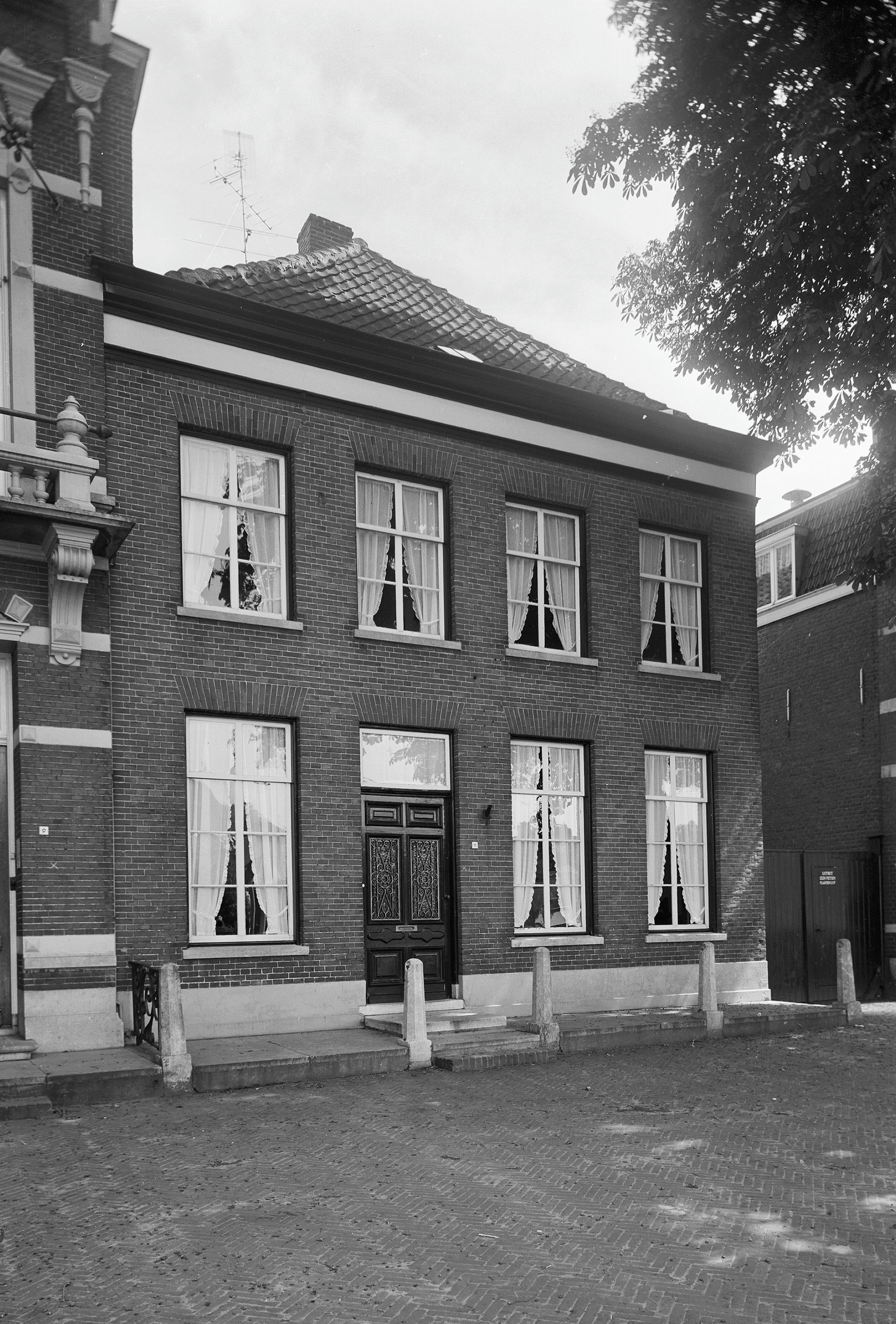
market square, June 1968

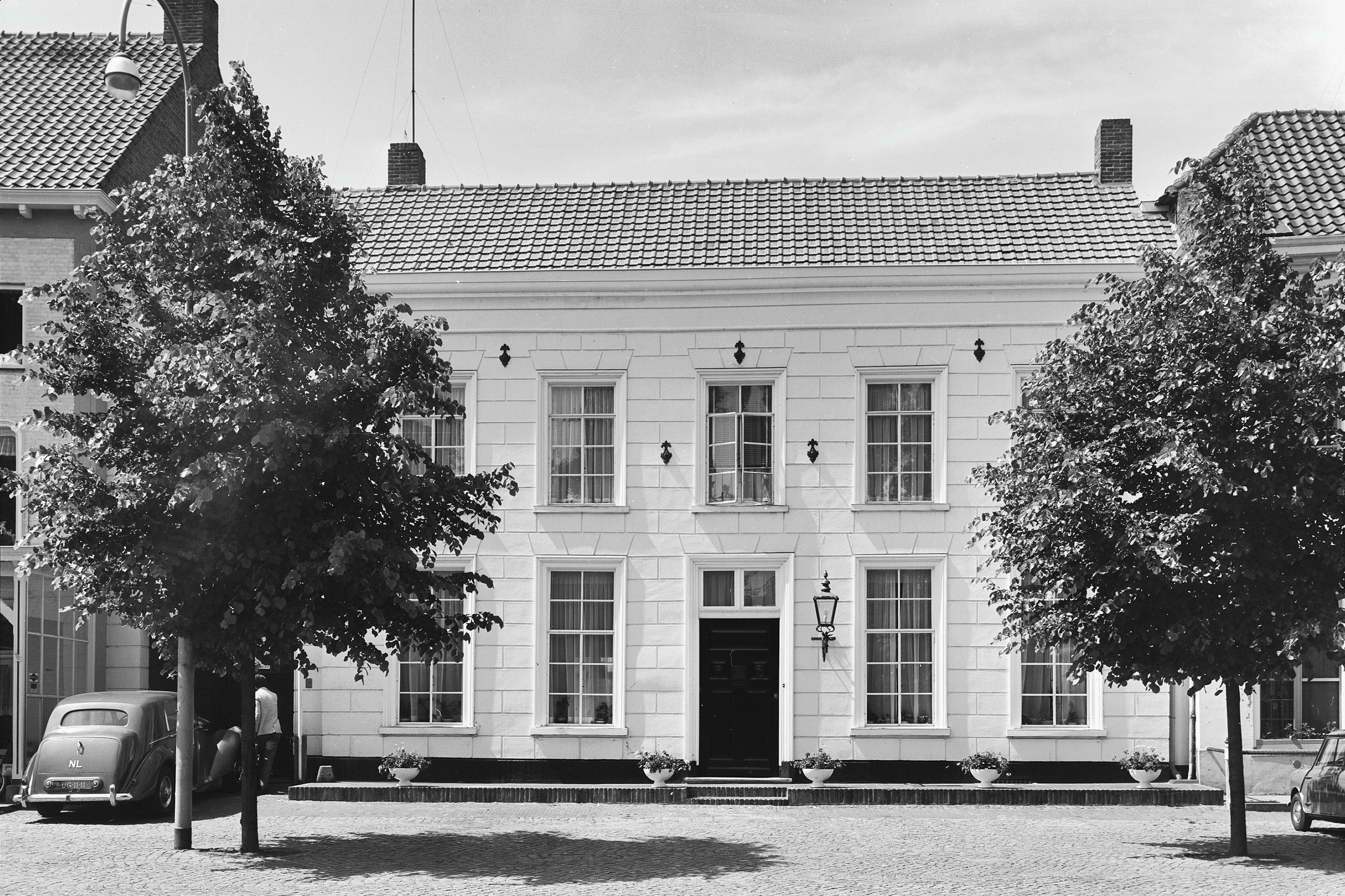
market square, June 1968

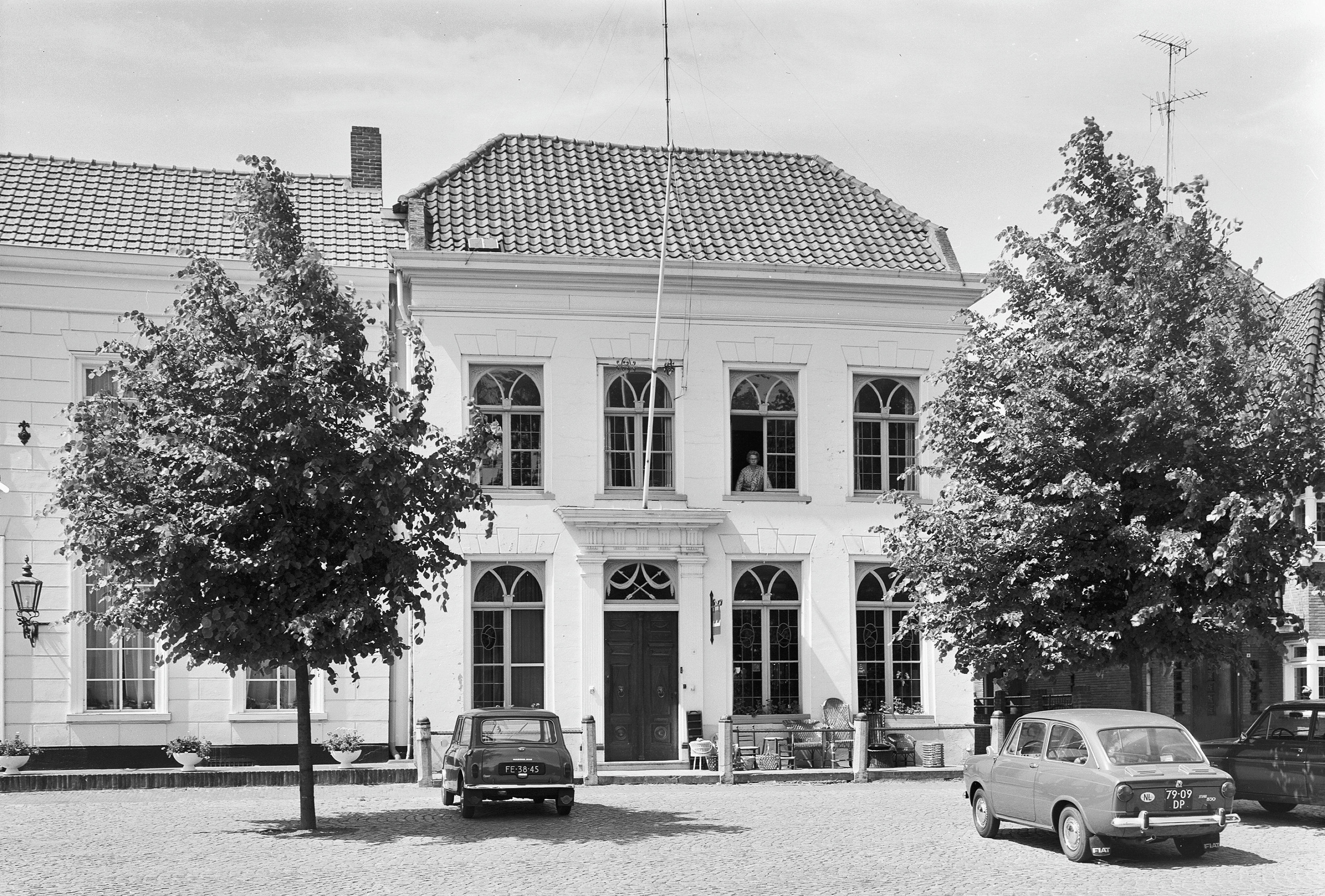
market square, June 1968

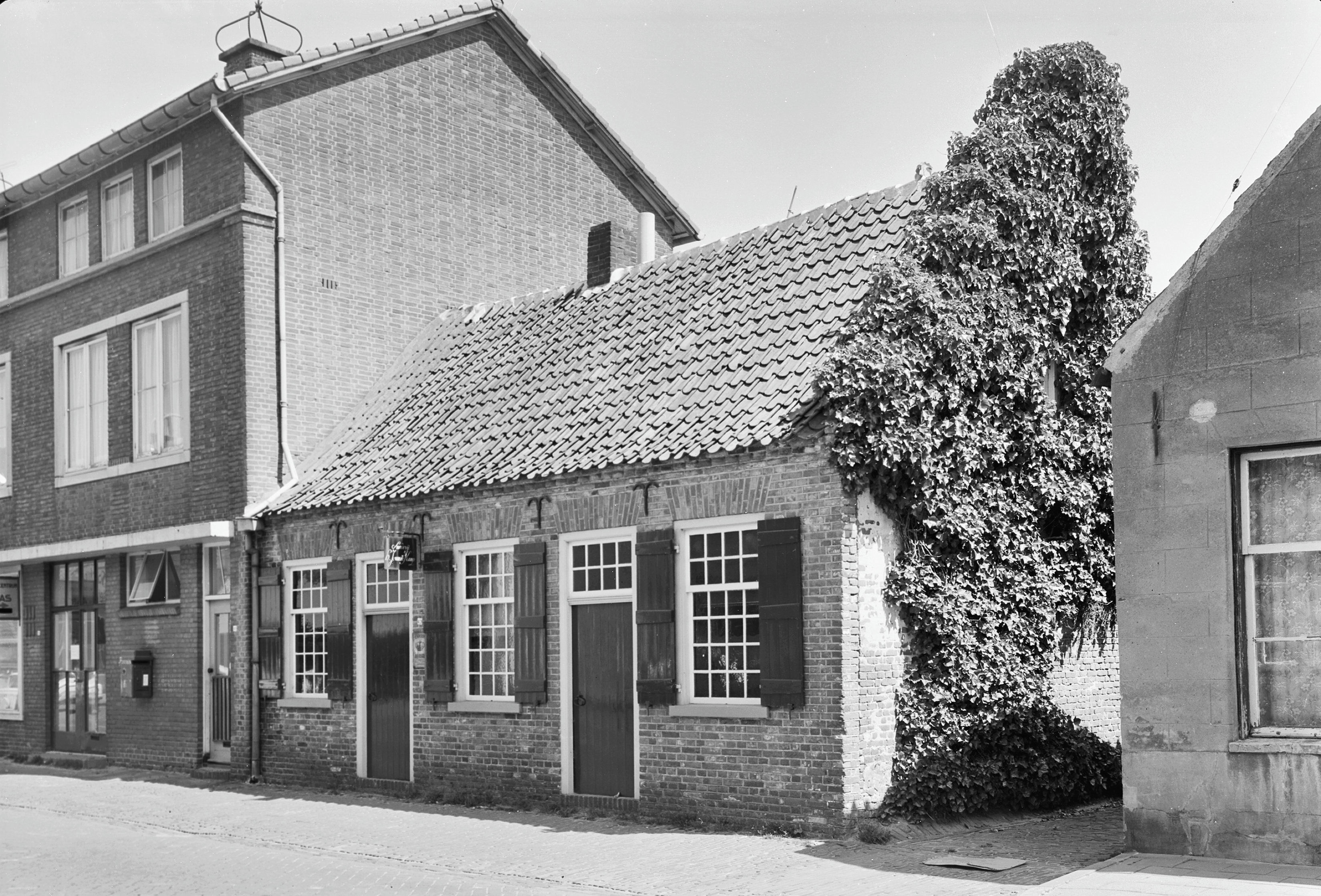
Museum with old forge, 't Kofferen, June 1968

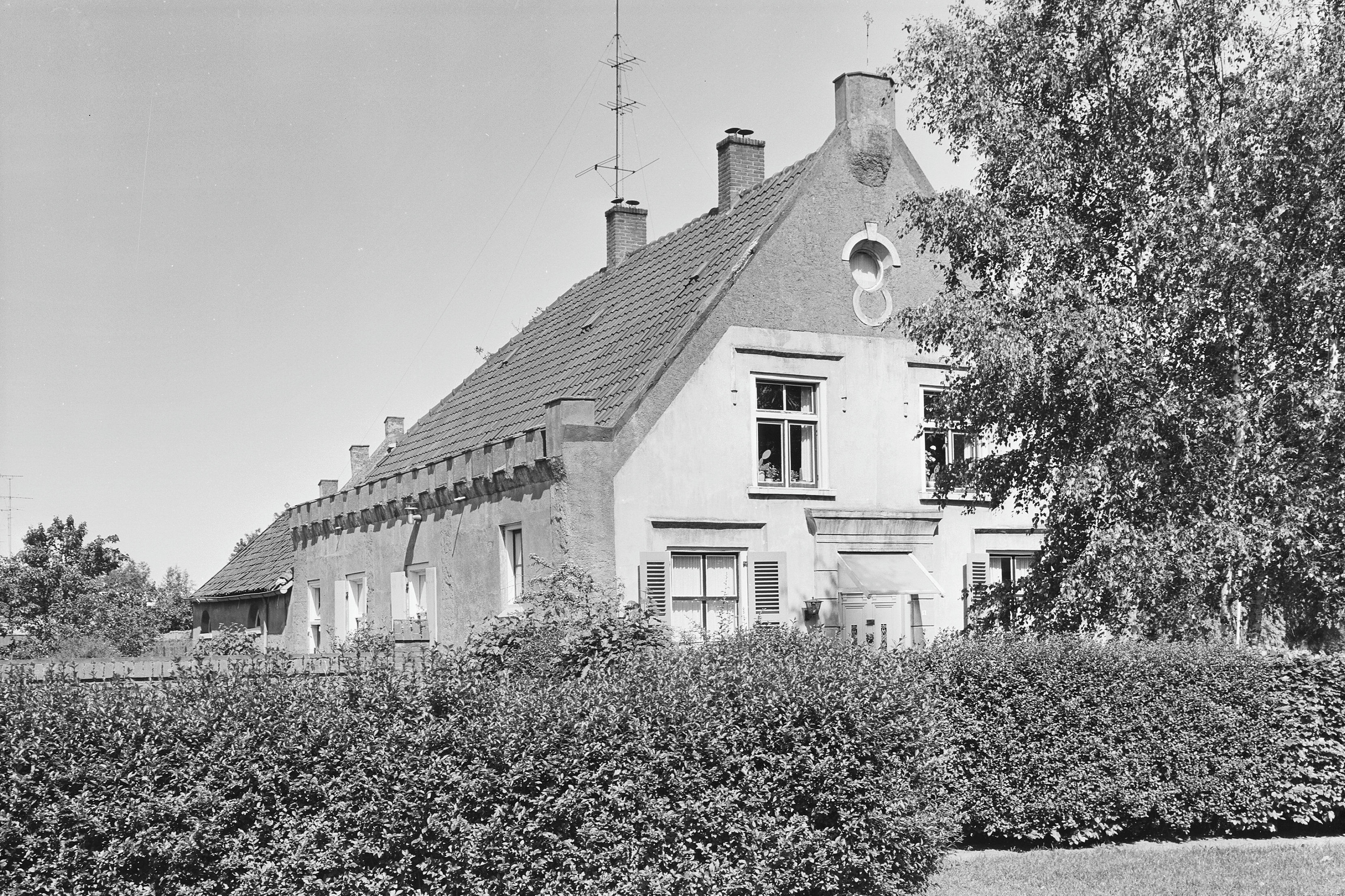
Kerkdijk, June 1968

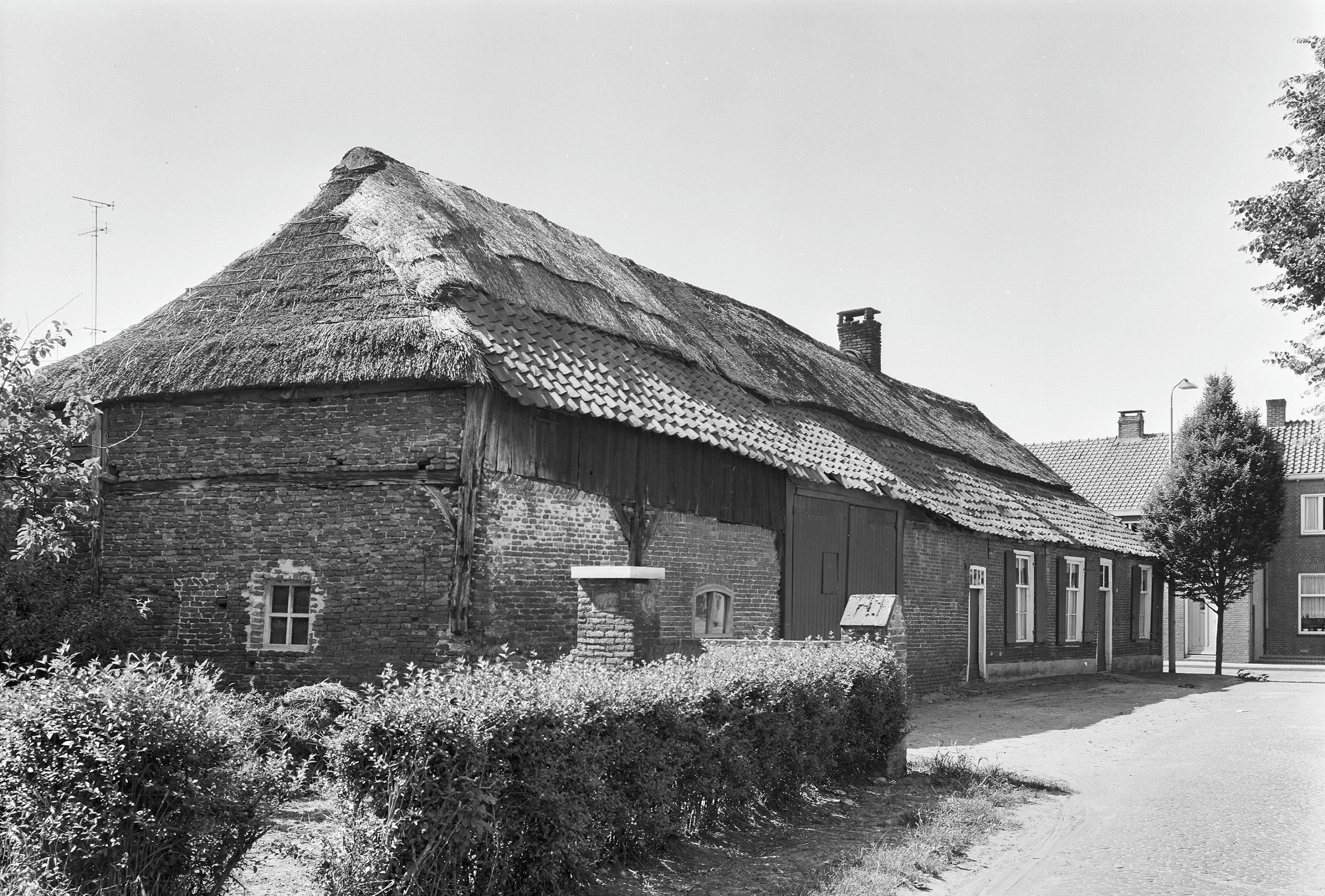
Kerkdijk, June 1968

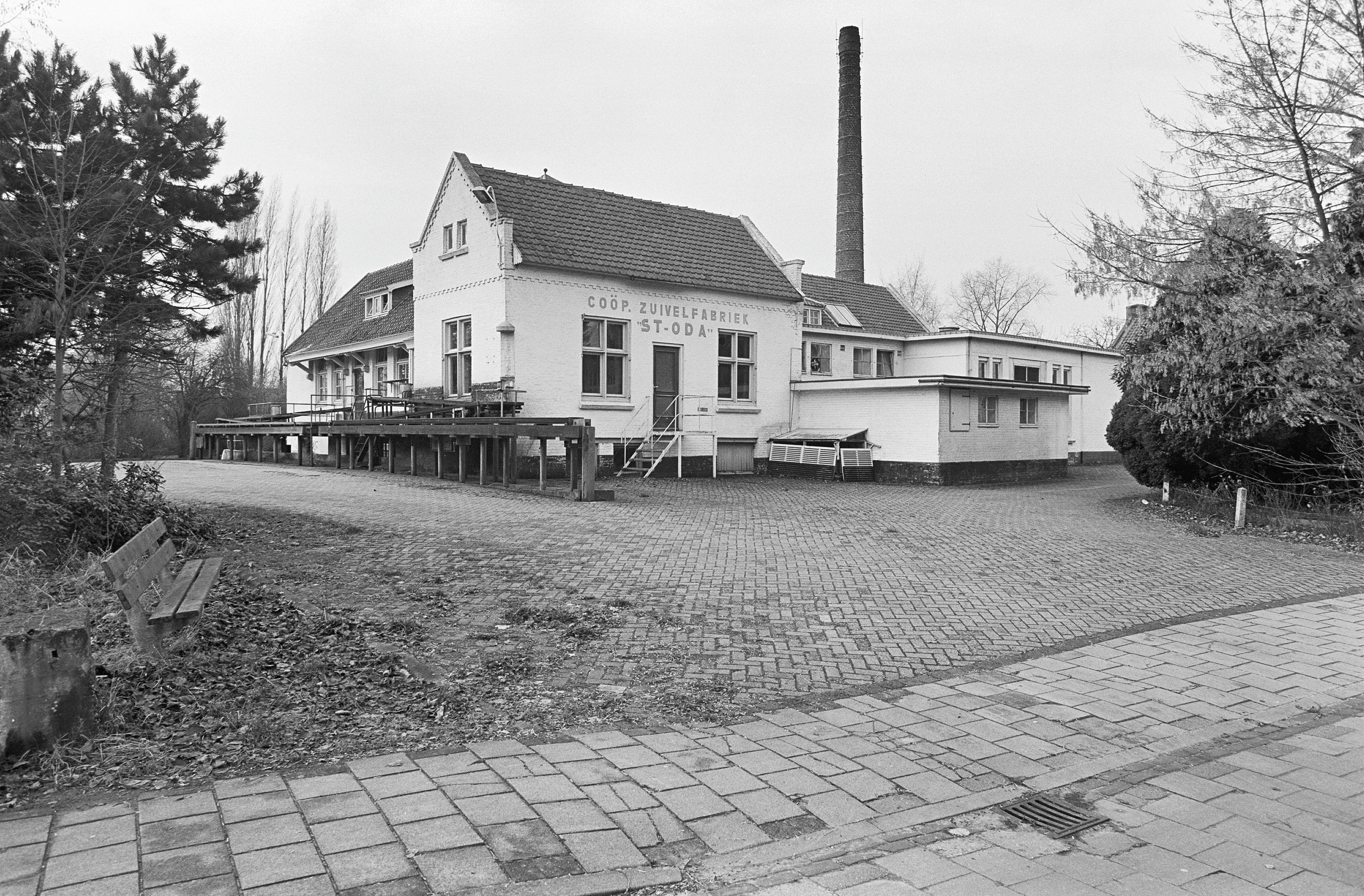
St. Oda factory, December 1980

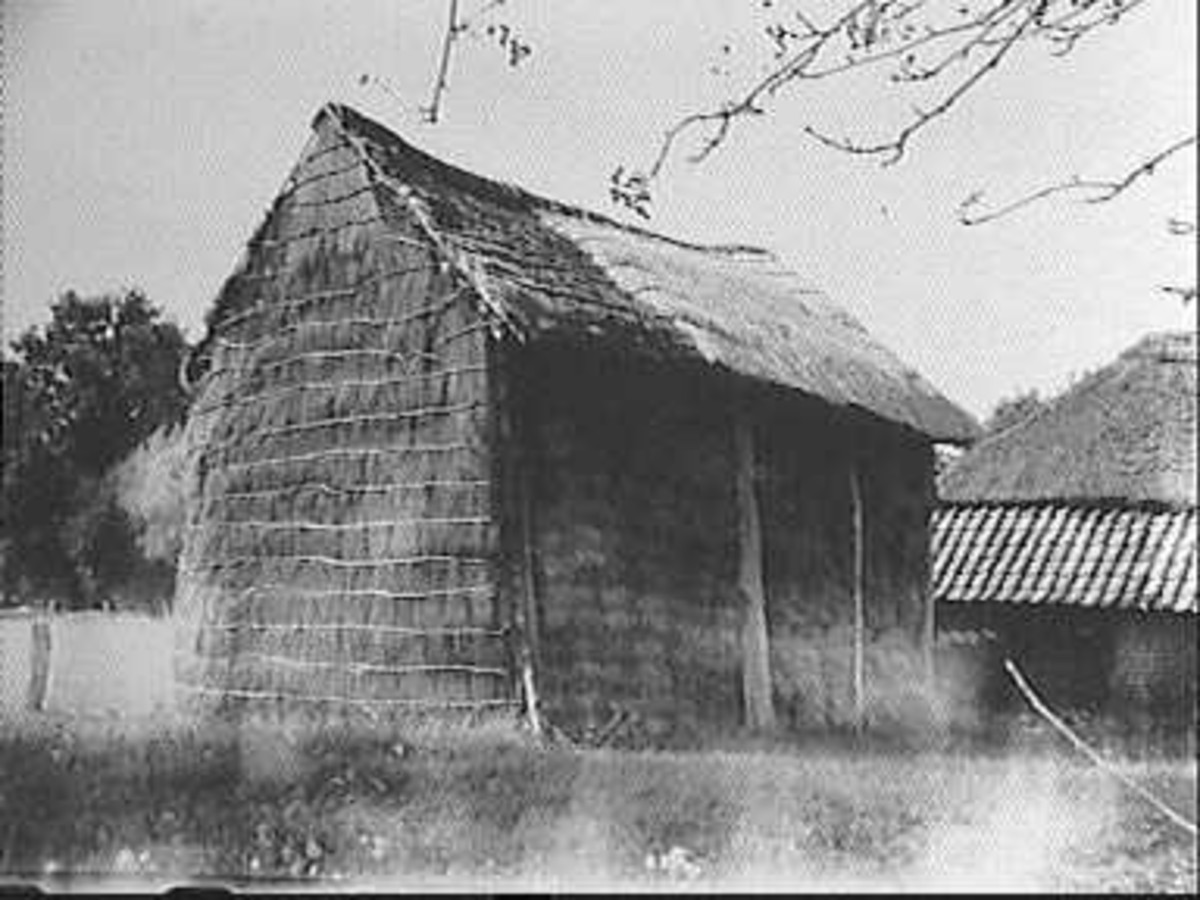
Hay shed, Lieshoutseweg, Nijnsel, September 7, 1984

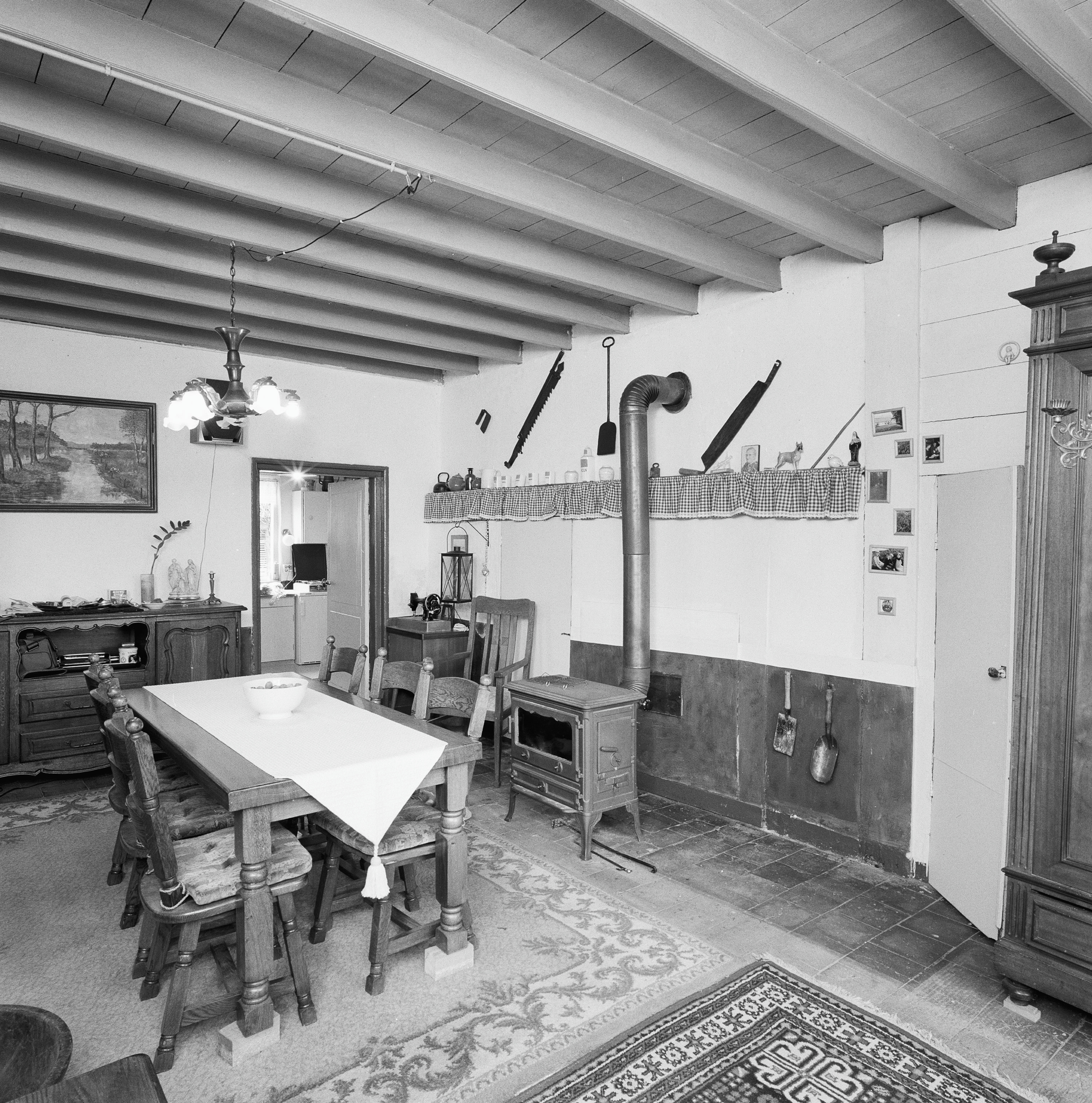
Traditional interior of Brabantian farm house, Sint-Oedenrode

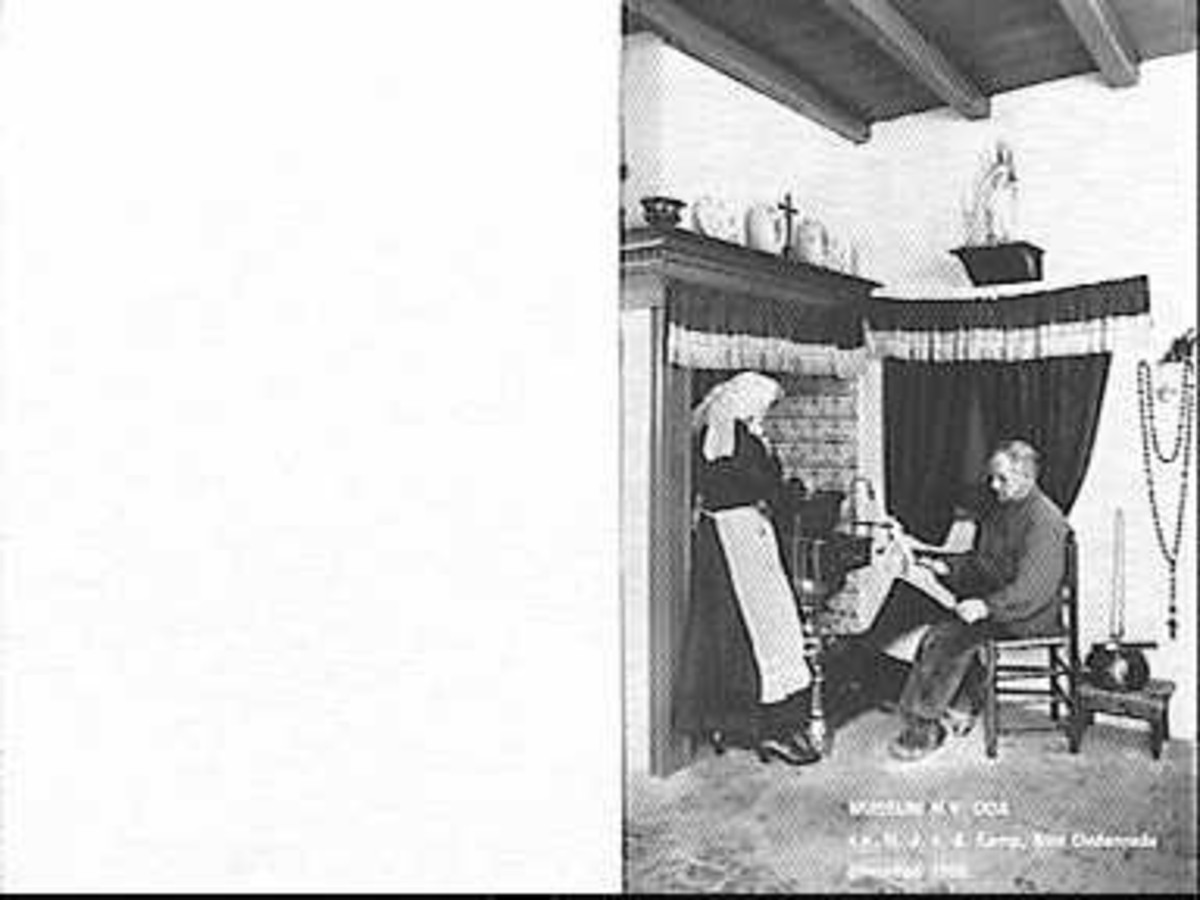
Interior of Brabantian farm house, Sint-Oedenrode, 1905

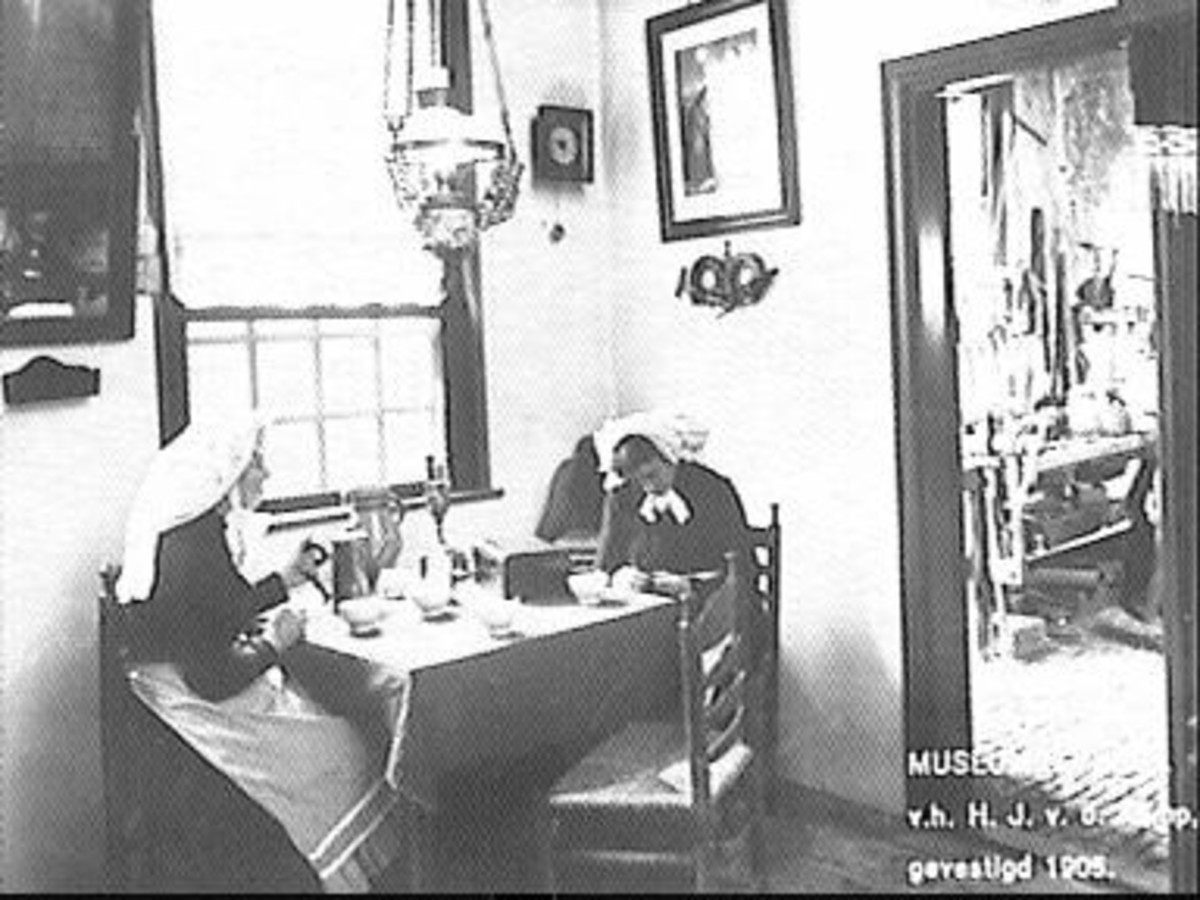
Interior of Brabantian farm house, Sint-Oedenrode, 1905

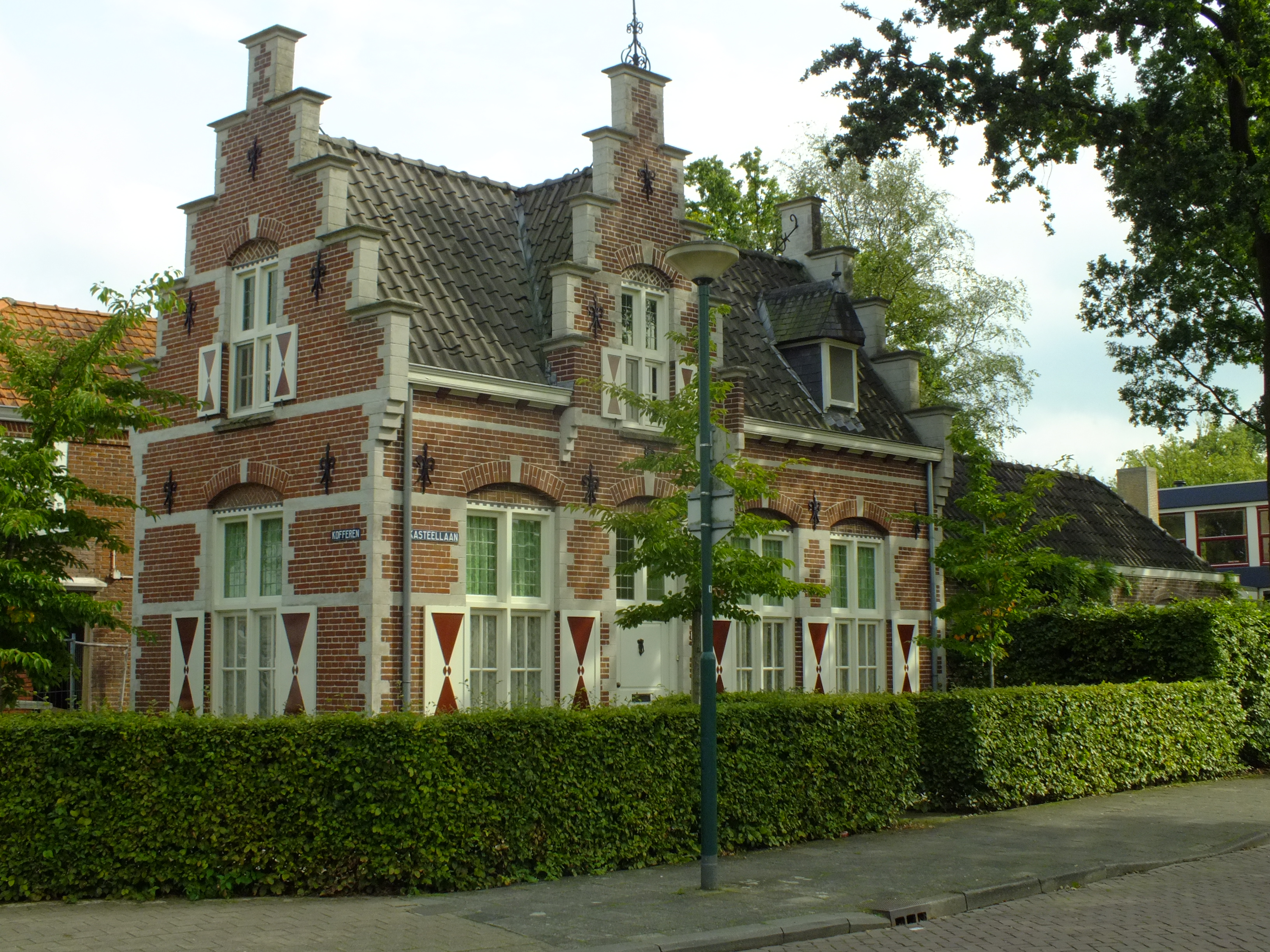
Porter's Lodge, Sint-Oedenrode

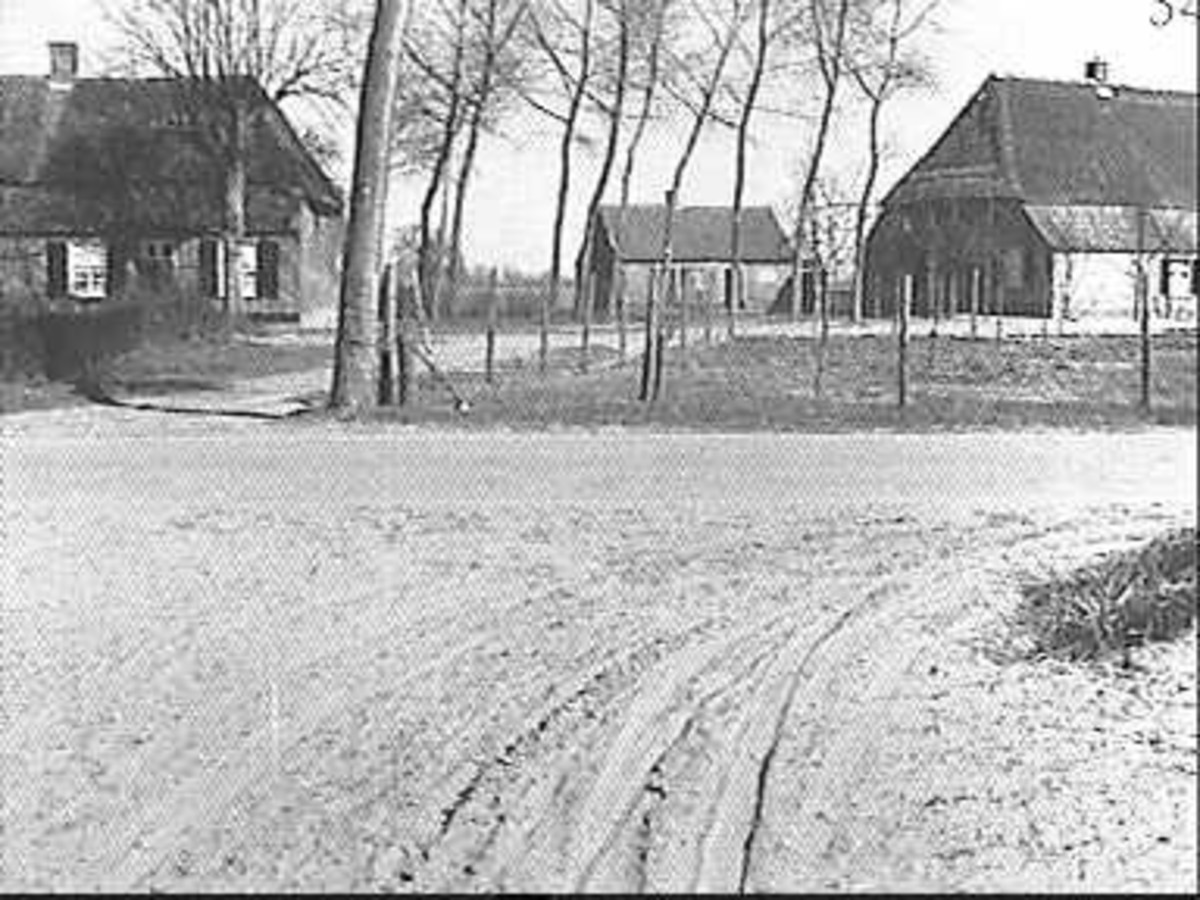
Old Brabant style farm stead, Liehoutseweg, 15 April 1942

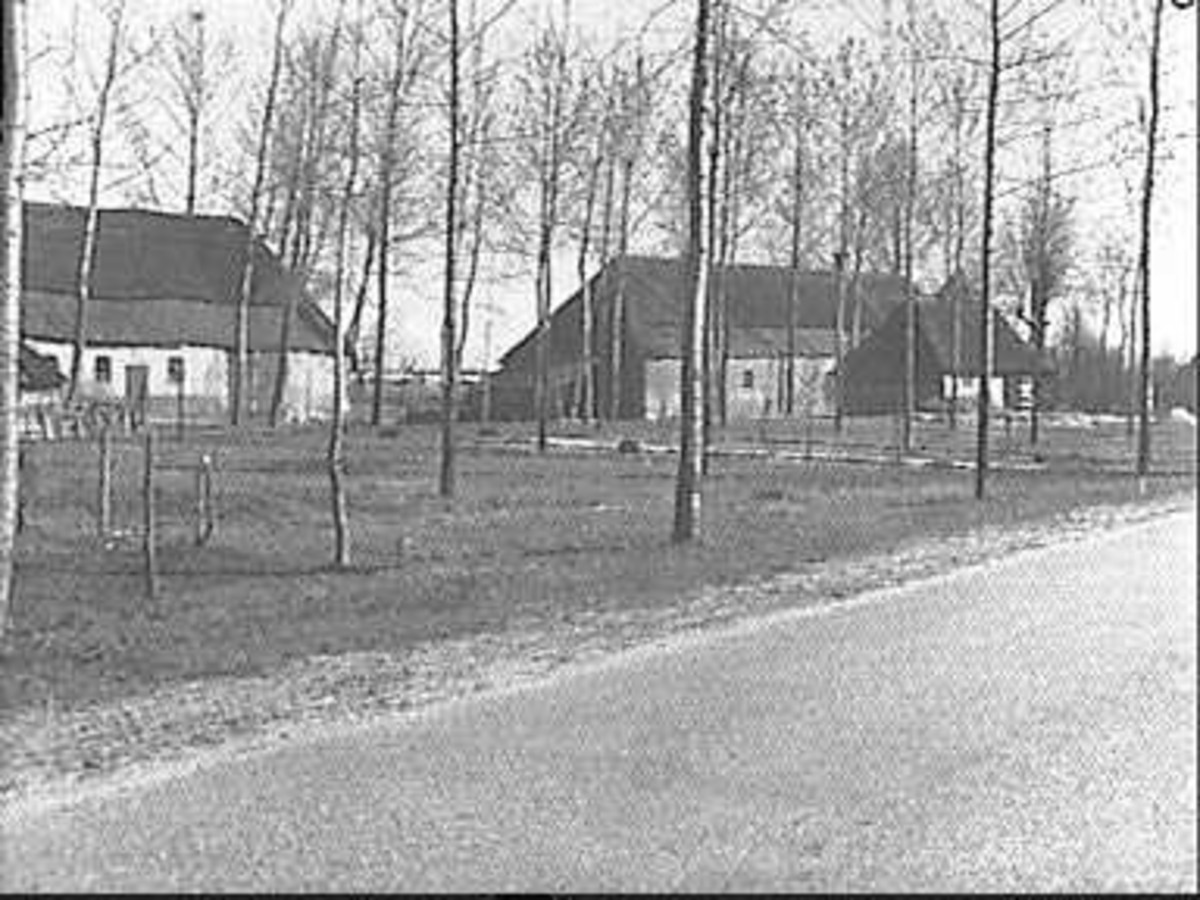
Old Brabant style farm stead, Lieshoutseweg, April 15, 1942

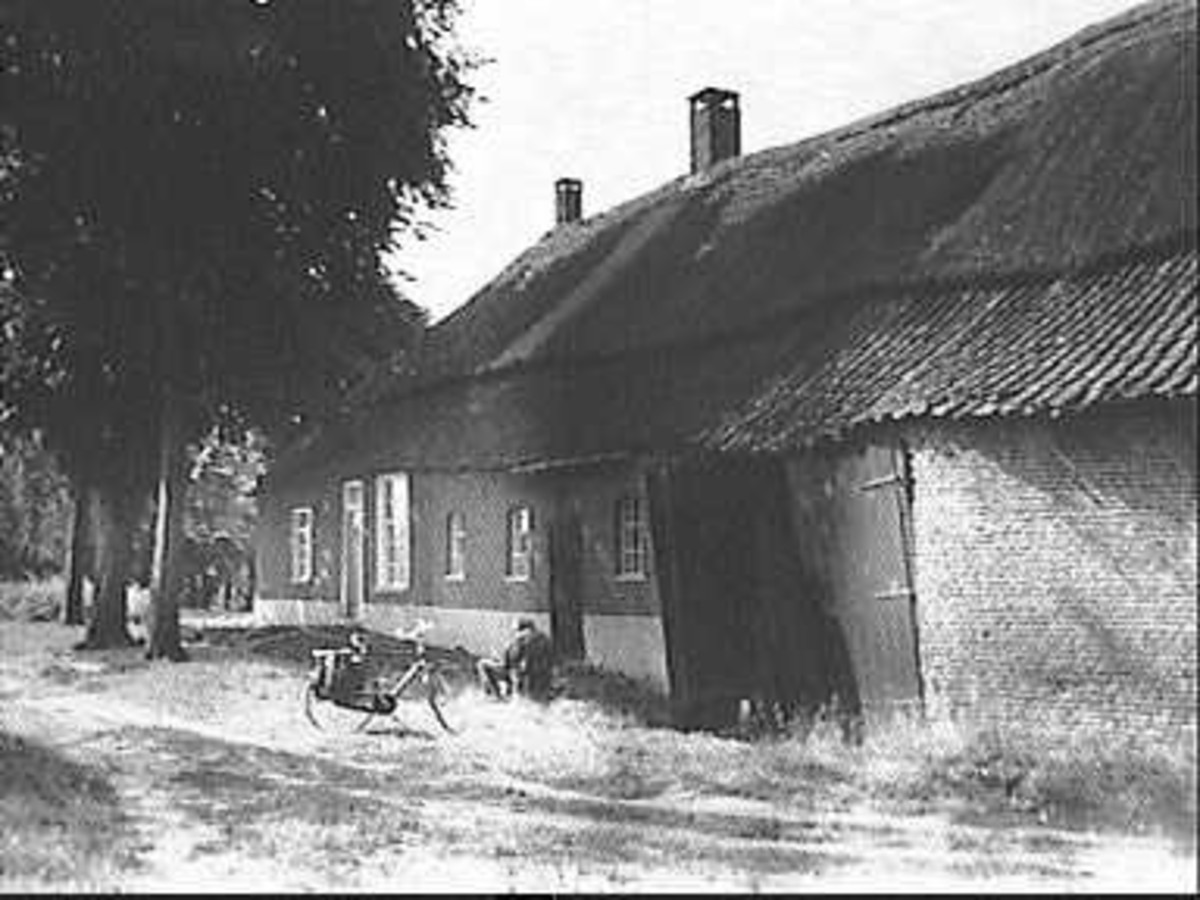
Old Brabant style farm stead, Lieshoutseweg, September 7, 1984

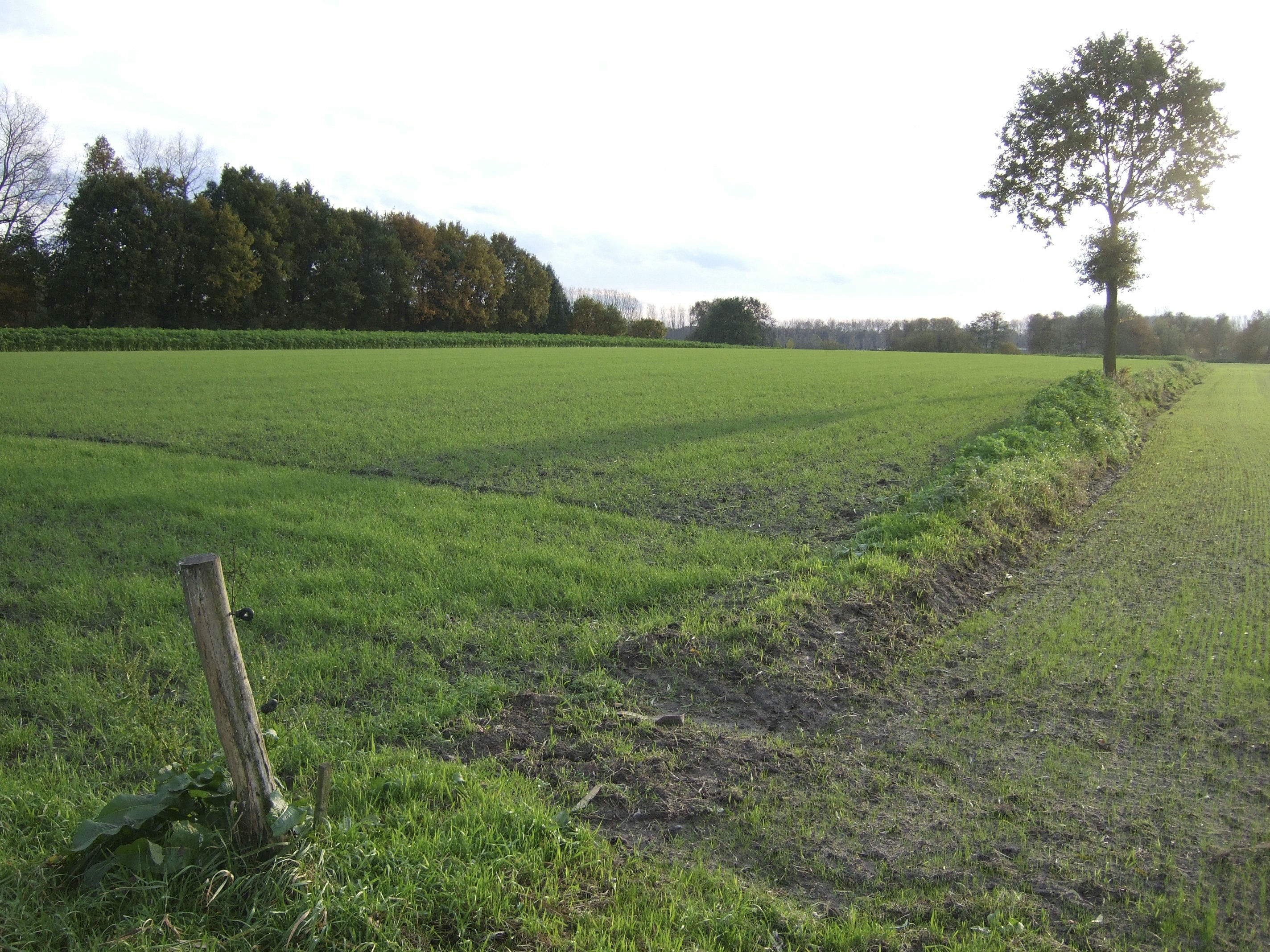
View of field in Olland where remains of Roman settlements were found

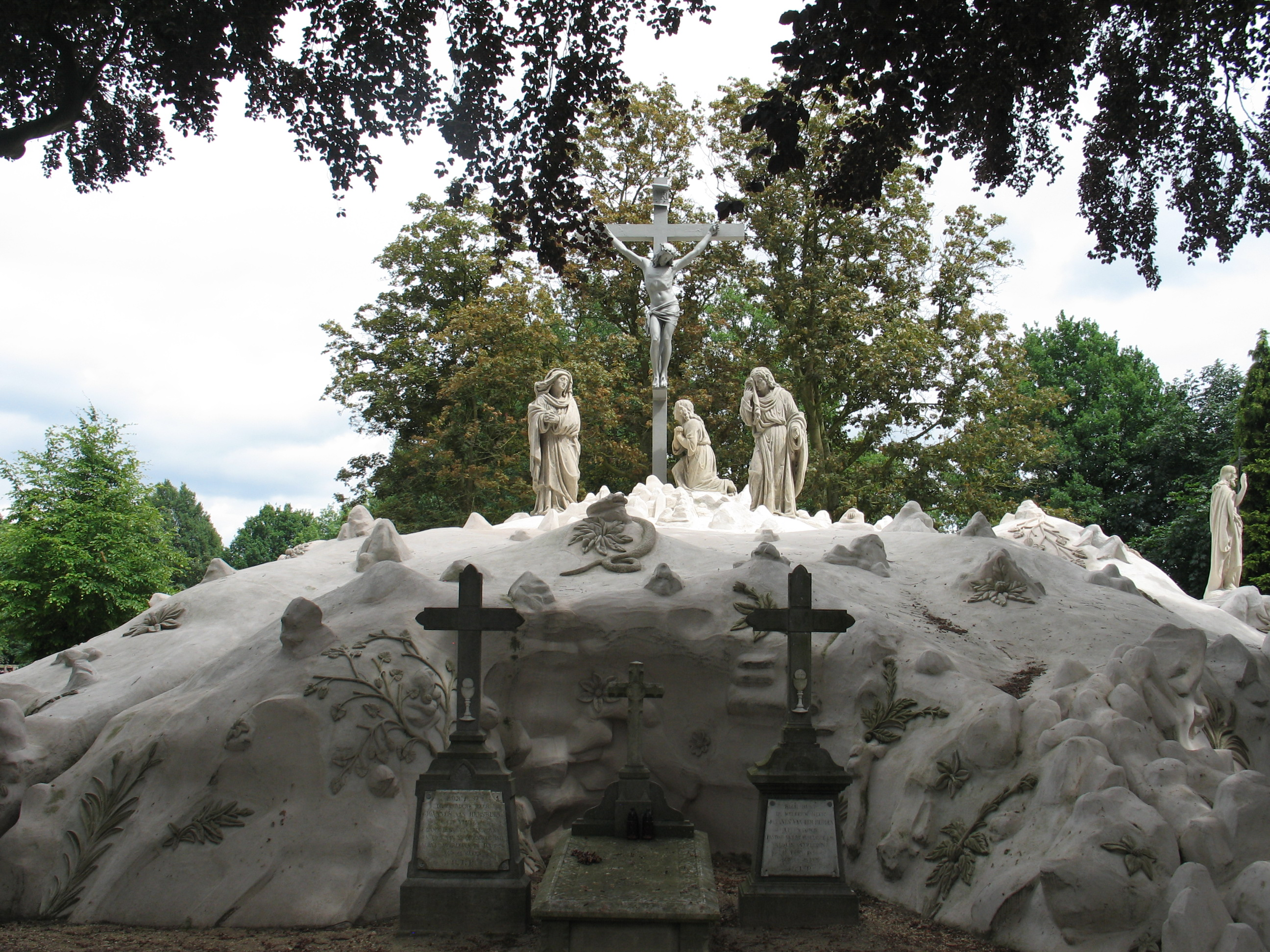
Calvary at Sint Martinus cemetery

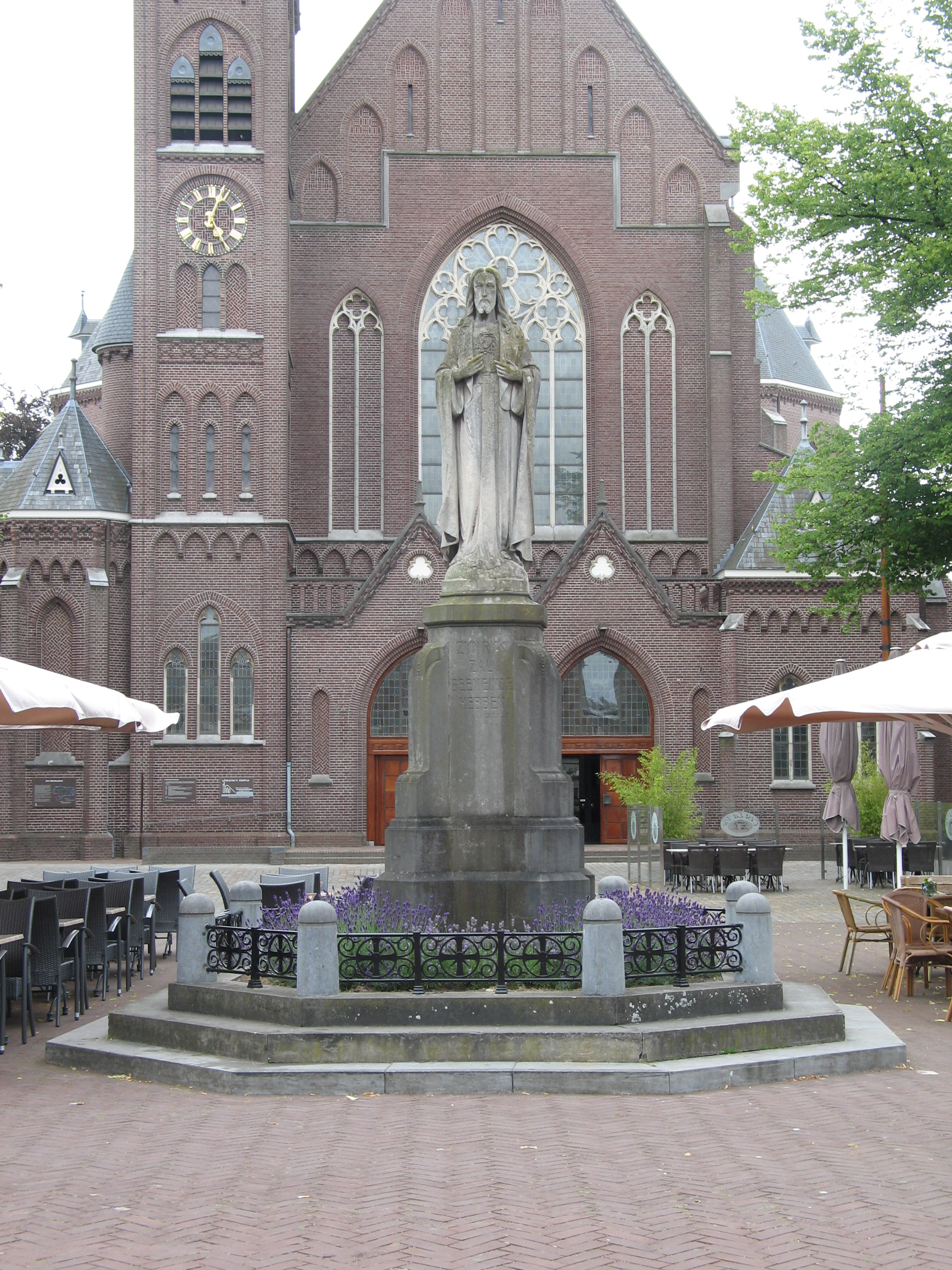
Sint Martinus Church, Sint-Oedenrode

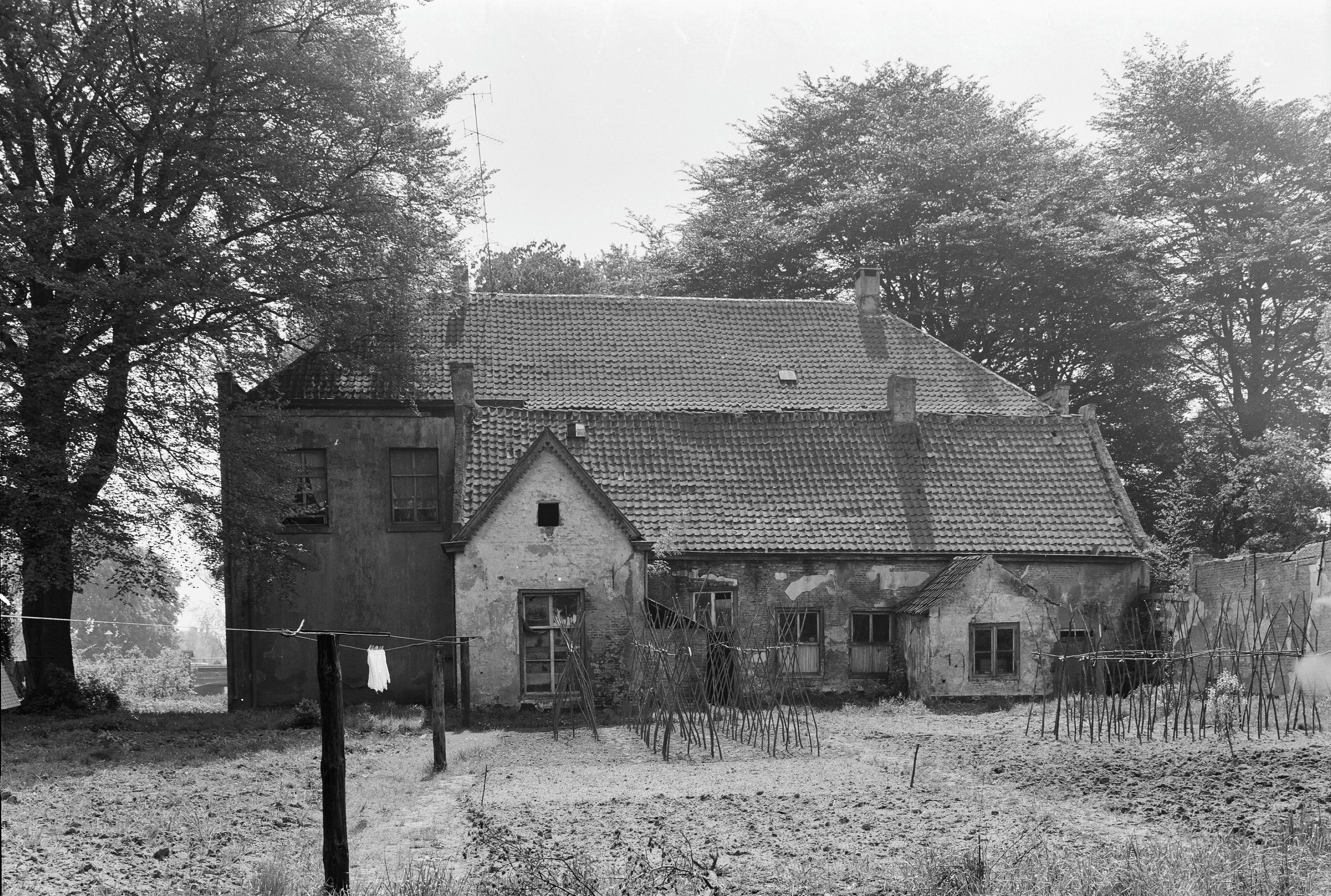
House "De Kolk", before restoration, May 1965

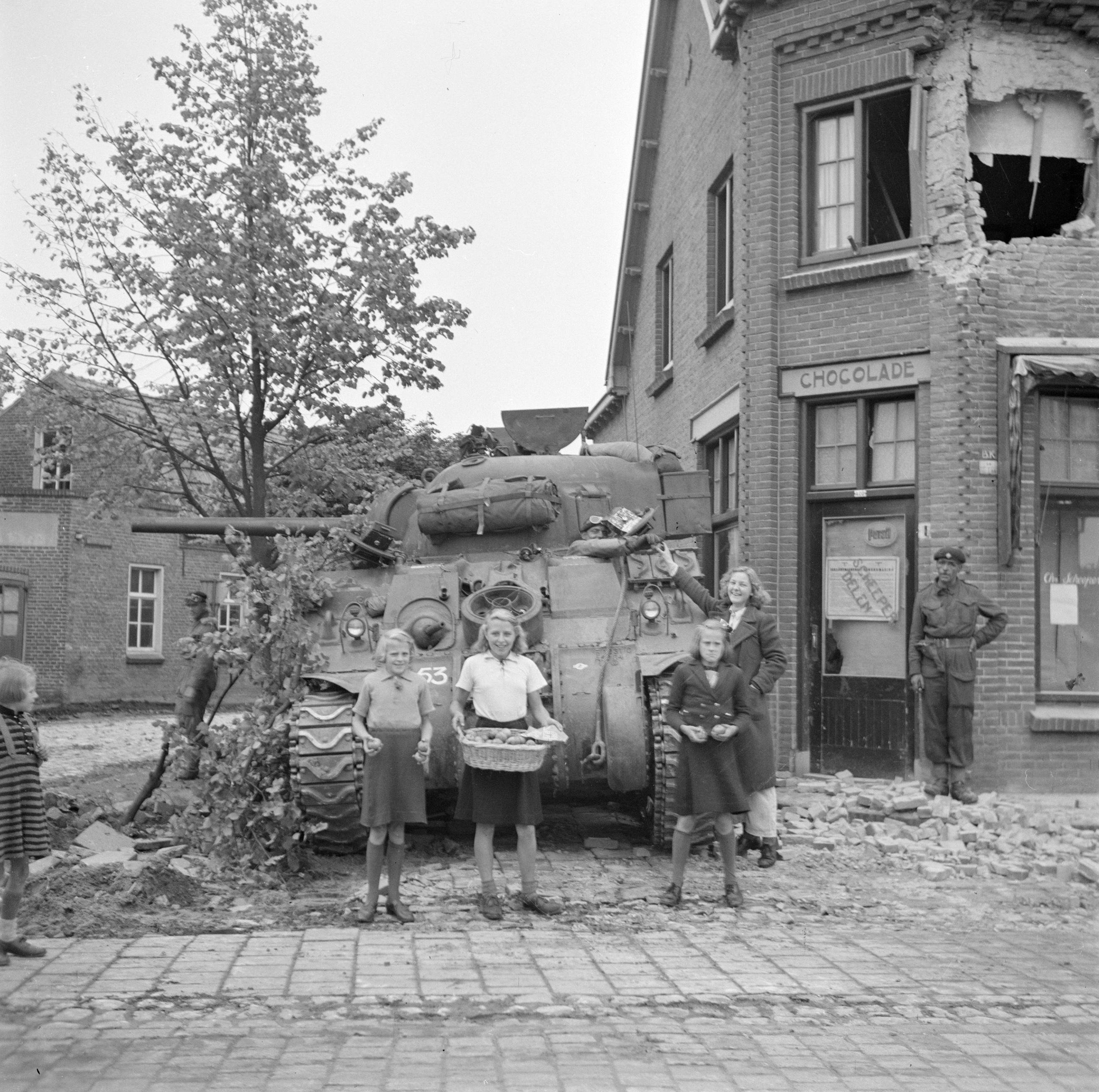
Children bring soldiers of the Irish Guards apples, 18-09-1944. In recognition of the courage, friendship and the sympathy which the population gave to the veterans of the U.S. 101st Airborne Division, the monument to thank the Dutch was founded exactly fifty years after Market Garden in Sint-Oedenrode.

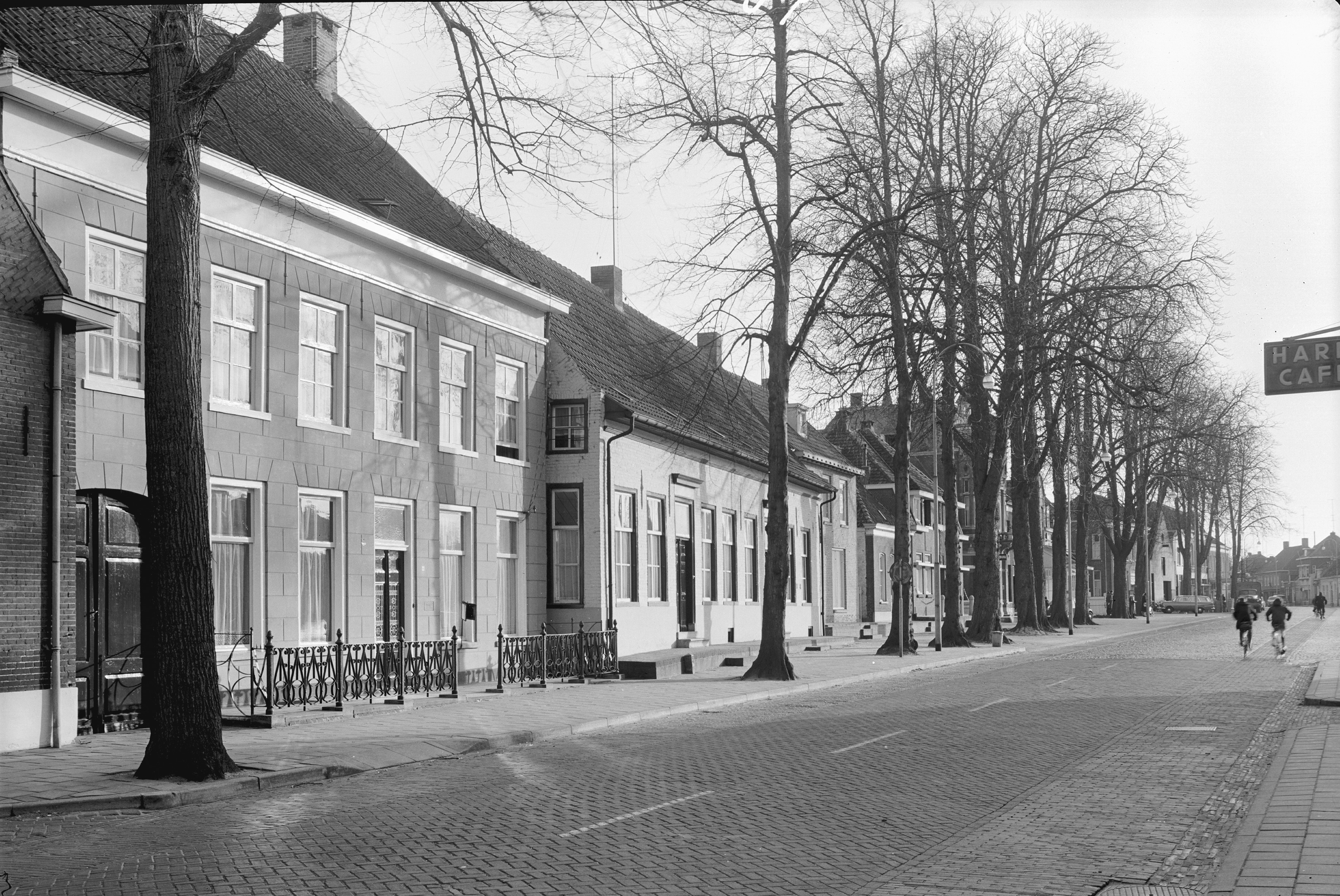
East side of the market square, Sint-Oedenrode, March 1964
