= Van Broeckhoven =

Van Broeckhoven is a surname. Notable people with the surname include:

- Christine Van Broeckhoven (born 1953), Belgian scientist and academic
- Steven Van Broeckhoven (born 1985), Belgian windsurfer
- Wiet Van Broeckhoven (1949–2019), Belgian radio presenter and author.

== de Brouchoven ==
Noble Flemish House of de Brouchoven de Bergheyck

- Jean de Brouchoven, 2nd Count of Bergeyck
- Hyacinthe-Marie de Brouchoven
- Louis de Brouchoven de Bergeyck
