= Van Rode =

Dutch noble family

- noble family
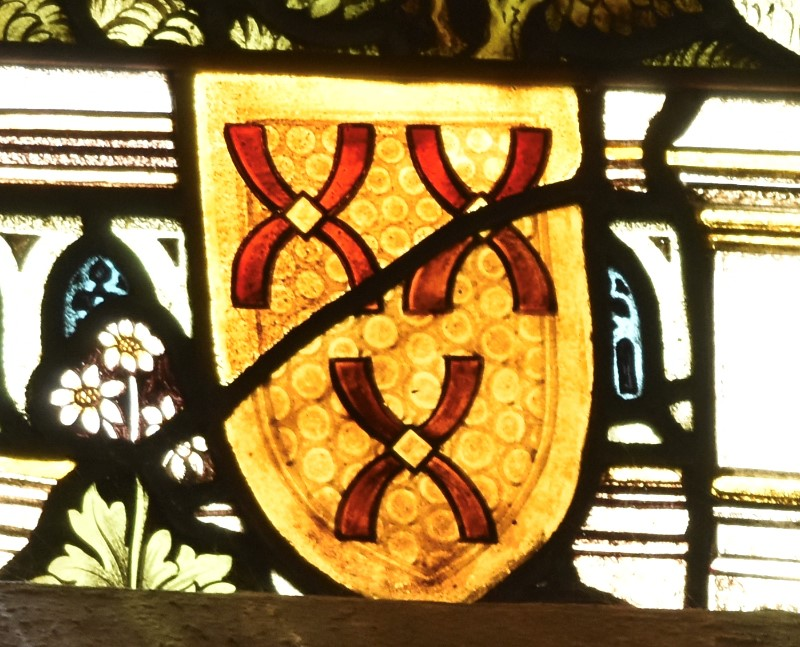
- Country: Netherlands
- Founded: 11th century
- Titles: Count of Rode; Lord of Rode; Lord of Mierlo; Knight
- Cadet branches: Van Montfoort, Van Vladeracken, De Brouchoven de Bergeyck, Van Stakenburg, Van den Hout, Van Mierlo and more.

The Van Rode (also De Rover) family was an old Dutch noble family primarily known for their reign over the County of Rode, which was part of the Duchy of Brabant. The first known member of the family was Arnold I van Rode, who lived around 1065 - 1120 and was acquainted with Godfrey of Bouillon. Descendants of Arnold I played an important role in the political and cultural history of Brabant. An example of this includes their role in the veneration of Saint Oda of Scotland and their frequent positions as schout and bailiff of the city of 's-Hertogenbosch. Several other (noble) families trace their origins to the Van Rode family, including the Van Montfoort and De Brouchoven de Bergeyck families. The crest of all these families include three millrinds.

== Literature ==
- Bijsterveld, A. J. A. (2018). Aristocratic identities and power strategies in Lower Lotharingia: The case of the Rode lineage (eleventh and twelfth centuries).
- Bijsterveld, A. J. A. (2016). Rondom Sint-OedenRode: Macht, religie en cultuur in de Meierij
