= Het Pelsken =

Painting by Peter Paul Rubens

The Fur
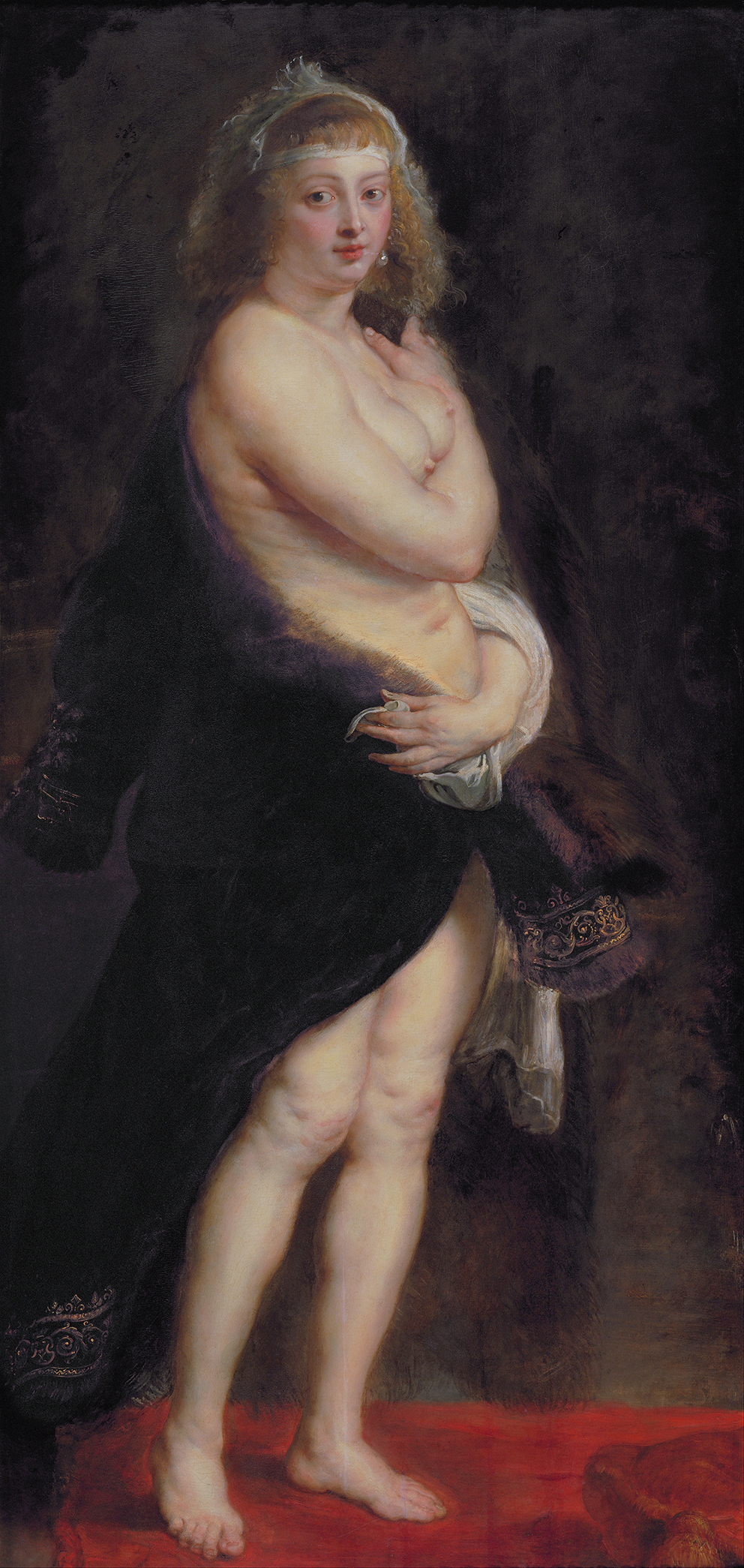
- Year: c. 1636–1638
- Medium: Oil on oak
- Dimensions: 176 cm × 83 cm (69 in × 33 in)
- Location: Kunsthistorisches Museum, Vienna
- Accession: GG_688

The Fur or The Pelt (Dutch: Het Pelsken), also called The Little Fur (German: Das Pelzchen; French: La Petite Pelisse), or Helena Fourment in a Fur Robe, is a c. 1636–1638 portrait by Peter Paul Rubens of his second wife Helena Fourment getting out of her bath and wrapping her voluptuous body in a fur. It is now in the Kunsthistorisches Museum in Vienna.

== Description ==
In this life-size portrait of Helena Fourment at the age of eighteen; her figure is wrapped only in a short mantle of black fur, loosely gathered round her shoulders and hips. Helena is represented standing, coming from the bath, half wrapped in the fur-trimmed cloak that gives its name to the picture, and imperfectly hides her nudity. The head is turned to the spectator, and according to Émile Michel "the countenance exhibits no sign of embarrassment or shame." Her breasts are pressed together and raised up by her right arm; her small, shapely left hand holds up a fold of the thick pelisse over her belly.

== Analysis ==
Her pose recalls the Venus pudica (lit. 'modest Venus') of Graeco-Roman sculpture, in which the goddess is shown nude as she prepares to bathe, discarding her drapery with one hand, while modestly shielding herself with the other. Another antecedent is Titian's Girl in a Fur, which Rubens knew. He even made a copy of the Titian, having seen it in the collection of Charles I in England. The execution of contrasting soft white flesh and rich dark fur has been praised in both paintings. Michel writes of this effect in the Rubens picture, "The frank black of the pelisse, the red of the carpet, and the brown of the background set off the brown of the background set off the brilliance of the flesh-tints".

Unlike Titian, who idealises his figure, Rubens depicts dimpled knees and folds of flesh and combines classicism with realism. Michel sees this as a fault, and writes, "The portrait is too exact, for inelegant forms are faithfully copied. The flesh lacks its former firmness, and clear traces of the compression of the bodice on the torso, and of the garters on the legs with their too perceptible knee-pans may be detected." However, other critics have praised this quality in Rubens; as Andrew Morrall notes, "Neither simply a portrait nor purely an image of a mythological deity, this intensely private work has ironically become one of the most celebrated erotic images in Western art."

== History ==
According to art historian Louis Hourticq, Rubens was too much in love with his young wife to hesitate to celebrate her beauty in his art. He surprised her one day on the way to her bath, and she yielded to her husband's fancy for painting her as she was. She would be quite naked but for the fur mantle thrown across her shoulders, which she holds in place with a charm. A tradition reported by Michel says that after Rubens died Madame Rubens hesitated to offer some of his pictures for sale, and a special clause in his will gave The Little Fur Coat to her as a personal gift.

== Provenance ==
- Mentioned in the will of Peter Paul Rubens in 1640;
- Mentioned in the will of Helena Fourment in 1658;
- Documented as being in the gallery in Vienna in 1730.

== Gallery ==
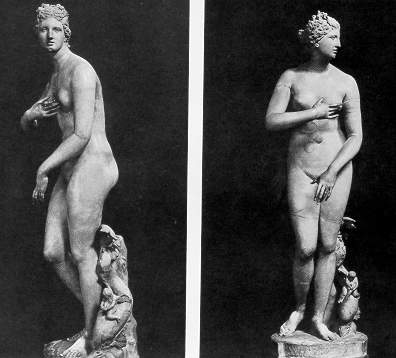
Venus de' Medici, 1st century BC; a variant of the Venus pudica type

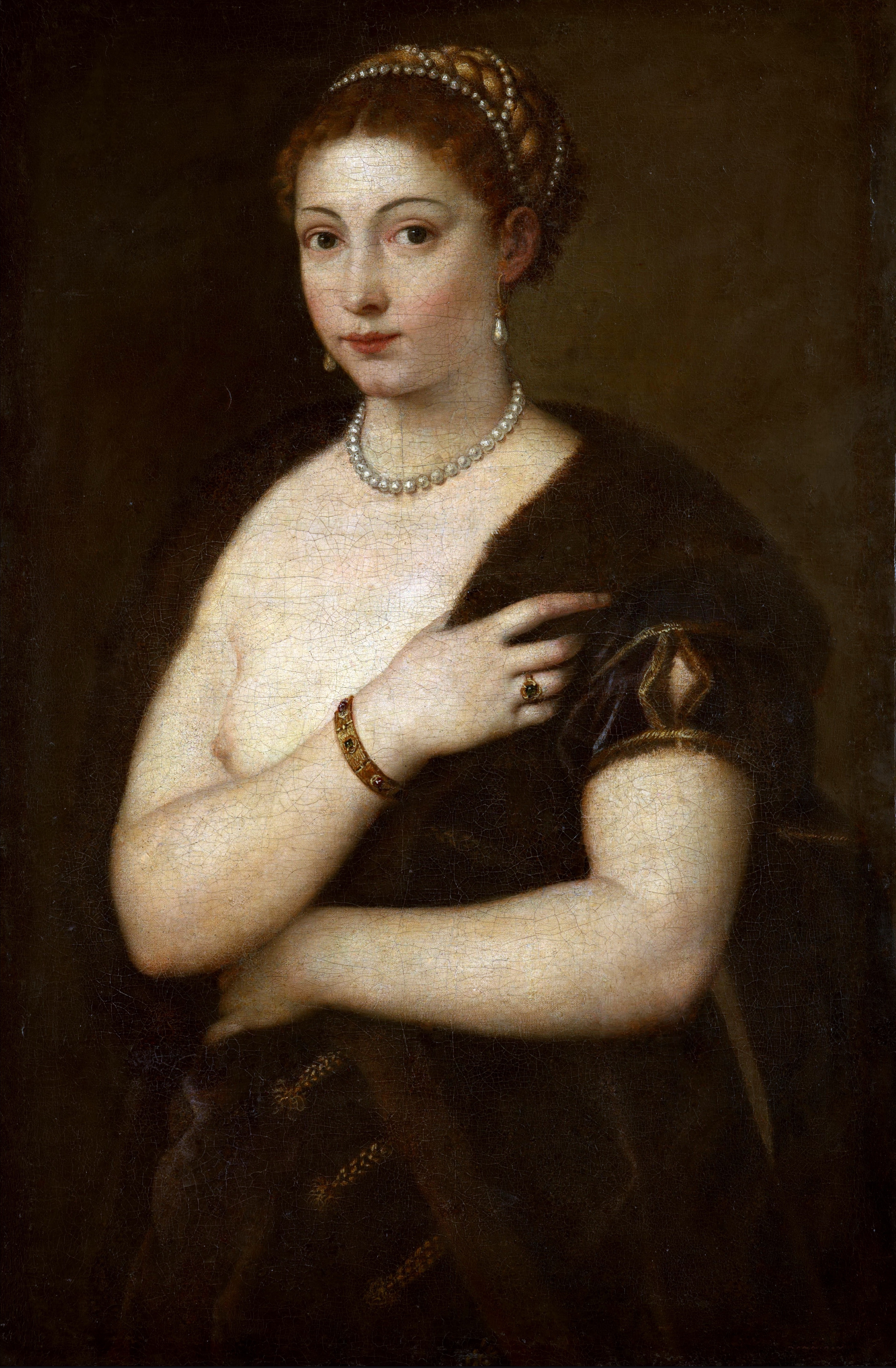
Girl in a Fur by Titian, c. 1536–1838

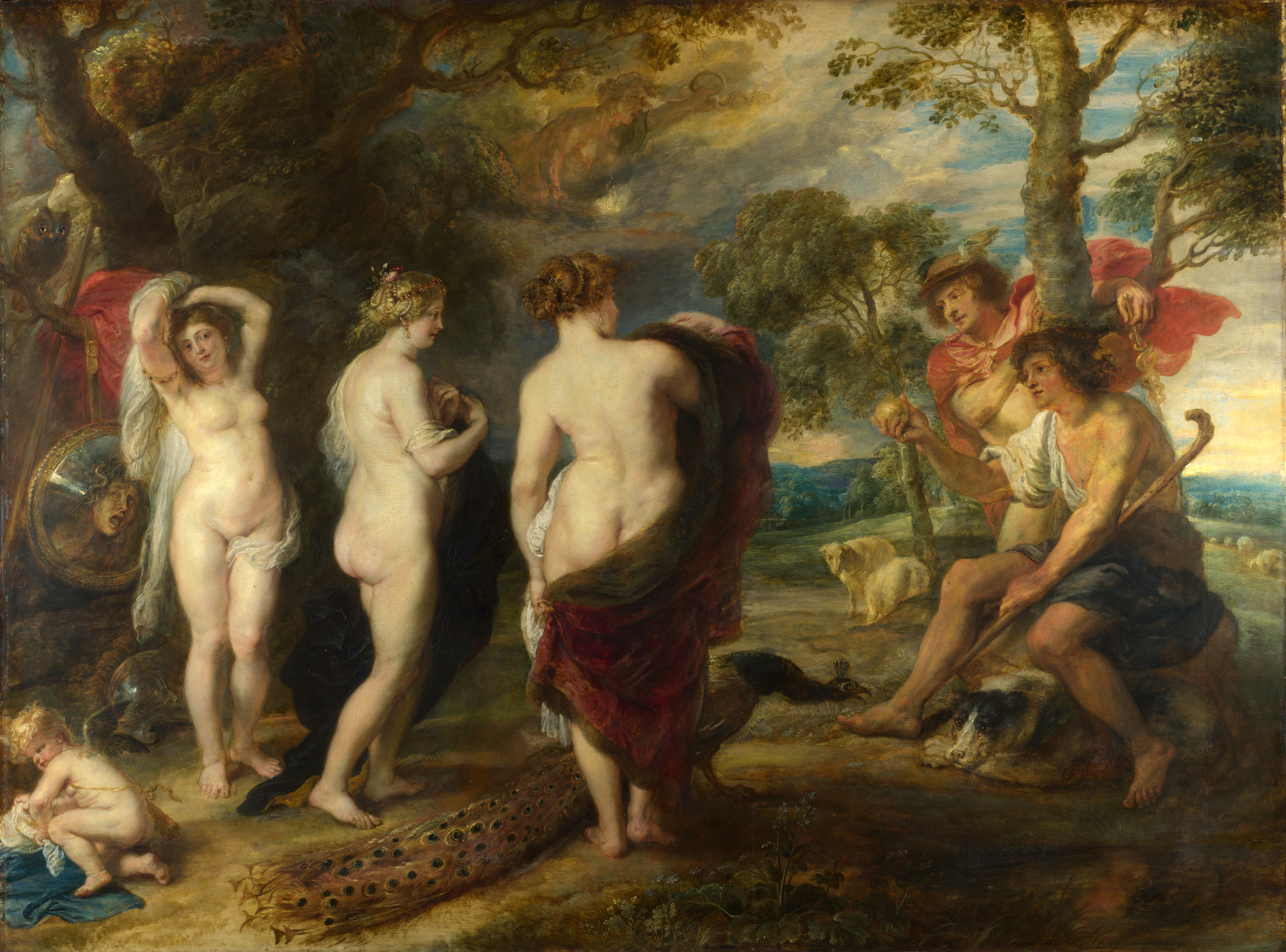
The Judgement of Paris by Rubens, c. 1636

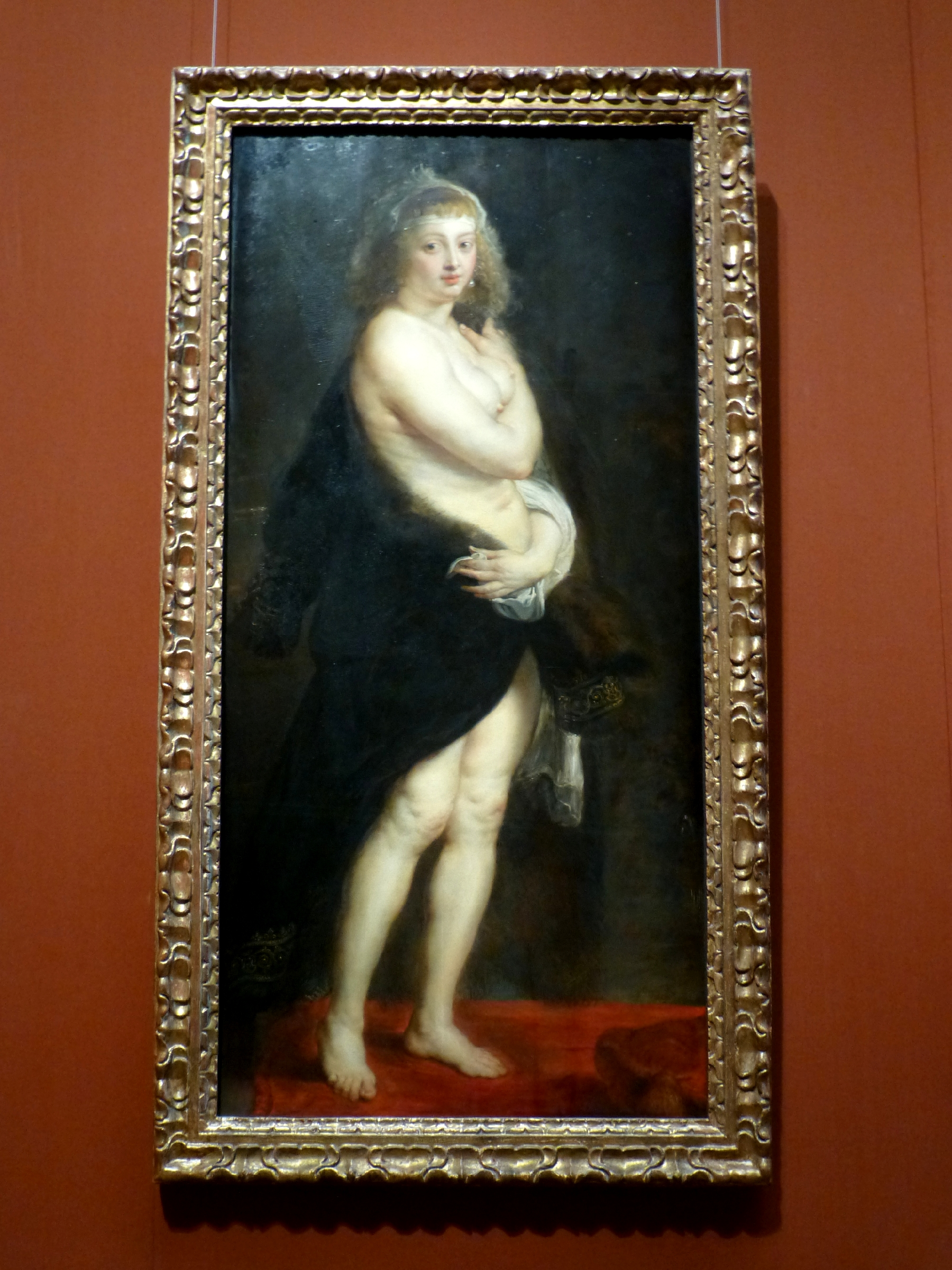
The Fur by Rubens, on display in its current frame

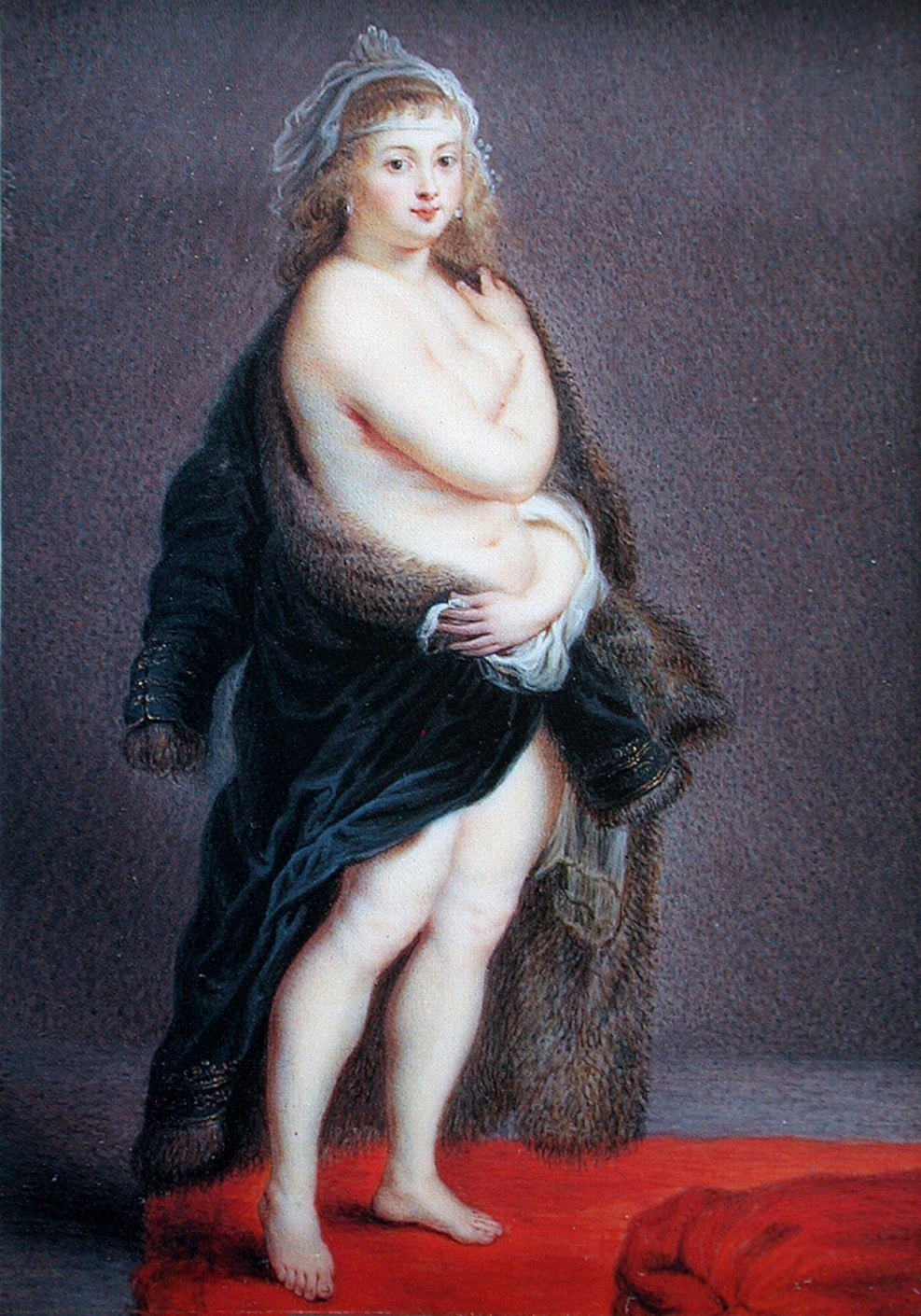
Copy by Wincenty de Lesseur in watercolour and gouache on ivory, 1793 (12.8 x. 8.9 cm)

== Sources ==
- Hourticq, Louis (1918). Rubens. Street, Frederick (tr.). New York: Duffield & Company. pp. 132, 135, 159
- Knackfuss, H. (1904). Rubens. Richter, Louise M. (tr.). (Monographs on Artists). New York: Lemcke & Buechner. p. 154.
- Michel, Émile (1899). Rubens: His Life, his Work, and his Time. Lee, Elizabeth (tr.). Vol. 2. London: William Heinemann; New York: Charles Scribner's Sons. pp. 175–176.
- Morrall, Andrew (2003). Rubens. (History & Techniques of the Great Masters). Hertfordshire: Eagle Editions Ltd. pp. 16–19.
- Scribner, Charles (1989). Peter Paul Rubens. New York: Harry N. Abrams, Inc. pp. 39, 41,
- "Helena Fourment ("Das Pelzchen")". Kunsthistorisches Museum Wien. Retrieved 24 December 2022.
- "Young woman in a fur wrap (after Titian) c.1629–1630". Queensland Art Gallery. Retrieved 24 December 2022.
