= Helena Fourment =

Second wife of Peter Paul Rubens (1614–1673)

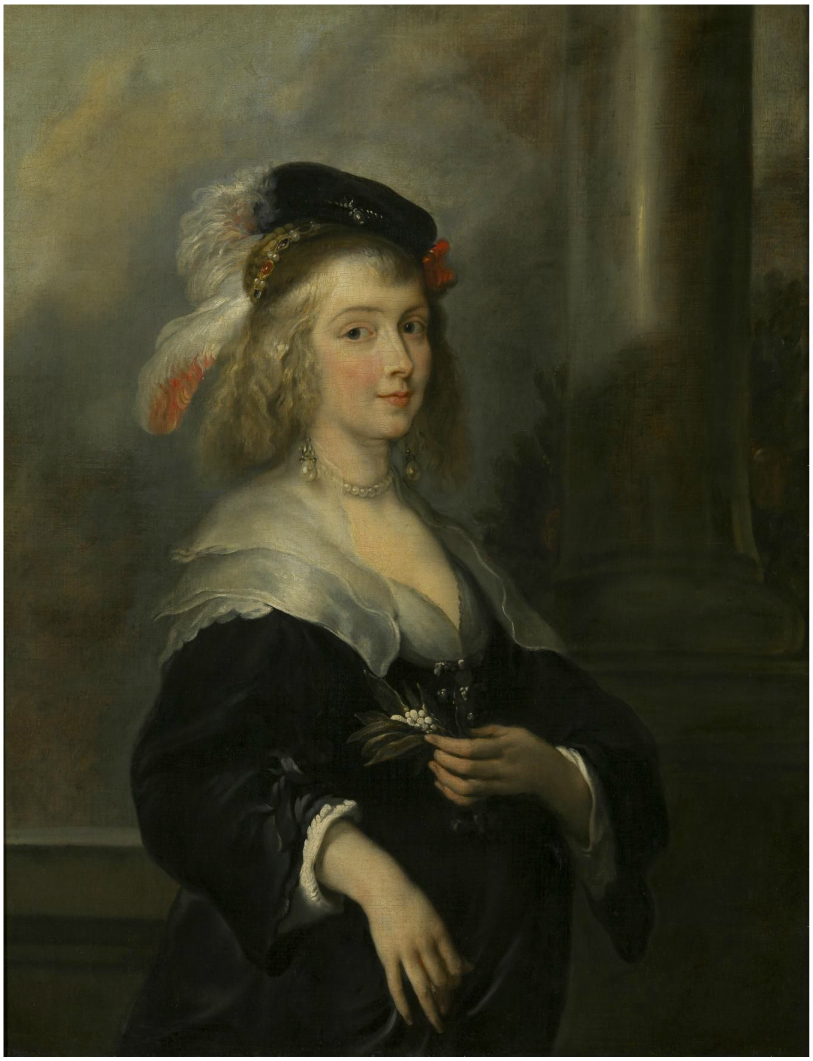
- Portrait by Jan Boeckhorst, c. 1630
- Born: 11 April 1614; Antwerp, Spanish Netherlands
- Died: 15 July 1673 (aged 59); Brussels, Spanish Netherlands
- Other name: Hélène Fourment
- Spouses: Peter Paul Rubens (m. 1630; died 1640) Jean-Baptiste de Brouchoven (m. 1645)
- Children: 11, including Jean and Hyacinthe-Marie
- Relatives: Susanna Lunden (sister); Alexander Rubens, Lord of Vremdyck (grandson); Stéphanie, Grand Duchess of Luxembourg (great-great-great granddaughter)

Helena (or Hélène) Fourment (11 April 1614 – 15 July 1673) was the second wife of Baroque painter Peter Paul Rubens. She sat for a few portraits by Rubens, and also modeled for figures in Rubens' religious and mythological paintings.

== Family ==
Helena Fourment was the youngest child of Daniël Fourment the elder, a wealthy Antwerp silk and tapestry merchant, and Clara Stappaerts. She had four brothers and six sisters. After his death, her father left to his son Daniël II an important collection of tapestries of Oudenaarde, Brussels and Antwerp, 35 paintings of his son-in-law Rubens, a large painting of Jordaens and several works of Italian masters. Most of her sisters married into important families.

Daniel I Fourment, died 1643 : marr. Clara Stappaerts.

  - Peeter Fourment, born 1590:
    Married to Antonia van Hecke.
  - Daniel II Fourment, Lord of Wijtvliet, born 1592:
    married to Clara Brant, sister of Isabella Brant (1591–1626).
  - Clara Fourment, (1593-1643):
    married to Peter van Hecke (1591–1645), tapestry dealer.
  - Joanna Fourment, born 1596:
    married to Balthasar-Nicolaas de Groot.
  - Susanna Fourment (1599–1628):
    married to Arnold Lunden, both painted by Rubens.
  - Maria Fourment, born 1601:
    married to Hendrick Moens.
  - Catharina Fourment, born 1603:
    married to Peeter Hannecaert, Alderman.
  - Joannes Fourment, born 1609:
    married to Marie Volpi.
  - Jacob Fourment, born 1611.
  - Elisabeth Fourment (1609–1667):
    married 23 October 1627 to Nicolas Pycqueri, died 1661: almoner of Antwerp.
  - Helena Fourment (1614–1673):
    first married to Peter Paul Rubens and later to the 1st count of Bergeyck.

== First marriage ==
Helena Fourment married Rubens on 6 December 1630 in the Saint James Church in Antwerp, when she was 16 years old and he was aged 53. Rubens' first wife, Isabella Brant, had died in 1626. Helena's brother Daniël Fourment the younger was married to Clara Brant, the sister of Isabella. Her father Daniël Fourment the elder was an art lover and possessed works by Rubens and Jacob Jordaens, and works by Italian masters; he also commissioned from Rubens a series of tapestries depicting the life of Achilles.

Peter Paul Rubens, marr. 2nd to Helena Fourment:

  - Clara-Joanna Rubens, baptized 18 January 1632: marr. Philips van Parys, knight
  - Frans, bapt. 12 July 1633: alderman of Antwerp in 1659, marr. Susanna-Gratiana Charles.
    - Alexander Rubens, Lord of Vremdyck.
  - Isabella-Helena Rubens, baptized 3 May 1635
  - Peter III Paul Rubens, baptized 1 March 1637: ordained priest.
  - Constantia-Albertina Rubens, baptized 3 February 1641: entered La Cambre Abbey in 1668.

== Second marriage ==
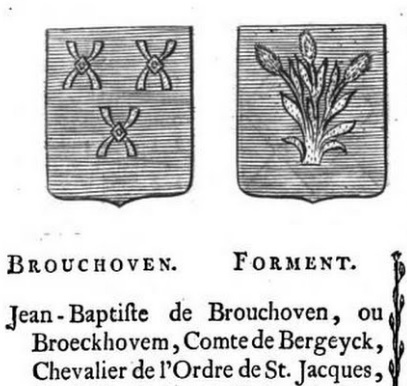
Helena Fourment and the 1st Count of Bergeyck

After the death of Rubens, Helena started a relationship with Jean-Baptiste de Brouchoven, assessor and alderman of Antwerp, who later became 1st Count of Bergeyk. On 9 October 1644 their first son Jean de Brouchoven, 2nd Count of Bergeyck, was born, and Helena and Jean-Baptist married in 1645. Her second husband, who was a military knight of St-Iago, outlived her and died during a diplomatic mission in Toulouse in 1681.

Jean-Baptist de Brouchoven, 1st count of Bergeyck; married to Helena Fourment

  1. Jean de Brouchoven, 2nd Count of Bergeyck, (1644–1725), later created 1st Baron of Leefdael:
    married to Livina Marie de Beer-Meulebeke.
    1. Nicolas-Joseph de Brouchoven, 3rd Count of Bergeyck, 2nd Baron of Leefdael: (descendants upon today).
  2. Hyacinthe-Marie de Brouchoven, Lord of Spy (1650–1707): 19th President of the Great Council;
    married to Marie-Adrienne Zuallart.
    1. Guillaume-François de Brouchoven, Lord of Spy: dies without heirs.
  3. Nicolas de Brouchoven, Lord of Attevoorde:
    married to Marie-Isabelle de Pommereaux, Lady of Hove
    1. Henri de Brouchove, Lord of Hove
  4. Catherine de Brouchoven':
    married to Gilles de Paepe, Lord of Glabbeecq, son of Léon-Jean de Paepe.
  5. Marie-Fernandine de Brouchoven: entered a Carmelite convent.
  6. Hélène-Isabelle de Brouchoven'; married Emmanuel-Joseph, Marquess of Villa-Flores

Helena died in Brussels in 1673 aged 59. She was buried together with her first husband, children and parents in the Saint James' Church in Antwerp. Amongst the many descendants of her grandson the 3rd Count of Bergeyck we find Louis de Brouchoven de Bergeyck and his great-granddaughter Stéphanie, Hereditary Grand Duchess of Luxembourg.

== Presence ==
Helena Fourment was said to be very beautiful, amongst others by the Cardinal-Infante Ferdinand of Austria, then Governor of the Netherlands, stating that she was "undoubtedly the most beautiful one may see here", and by the poet Gaspar Gevartius, a friend of Rubens, who praised "Helen of Antwerp, who far surpasses Helen of Troy".

== Paintings ==
=== Helena Fourment ===
==== Portraits ====
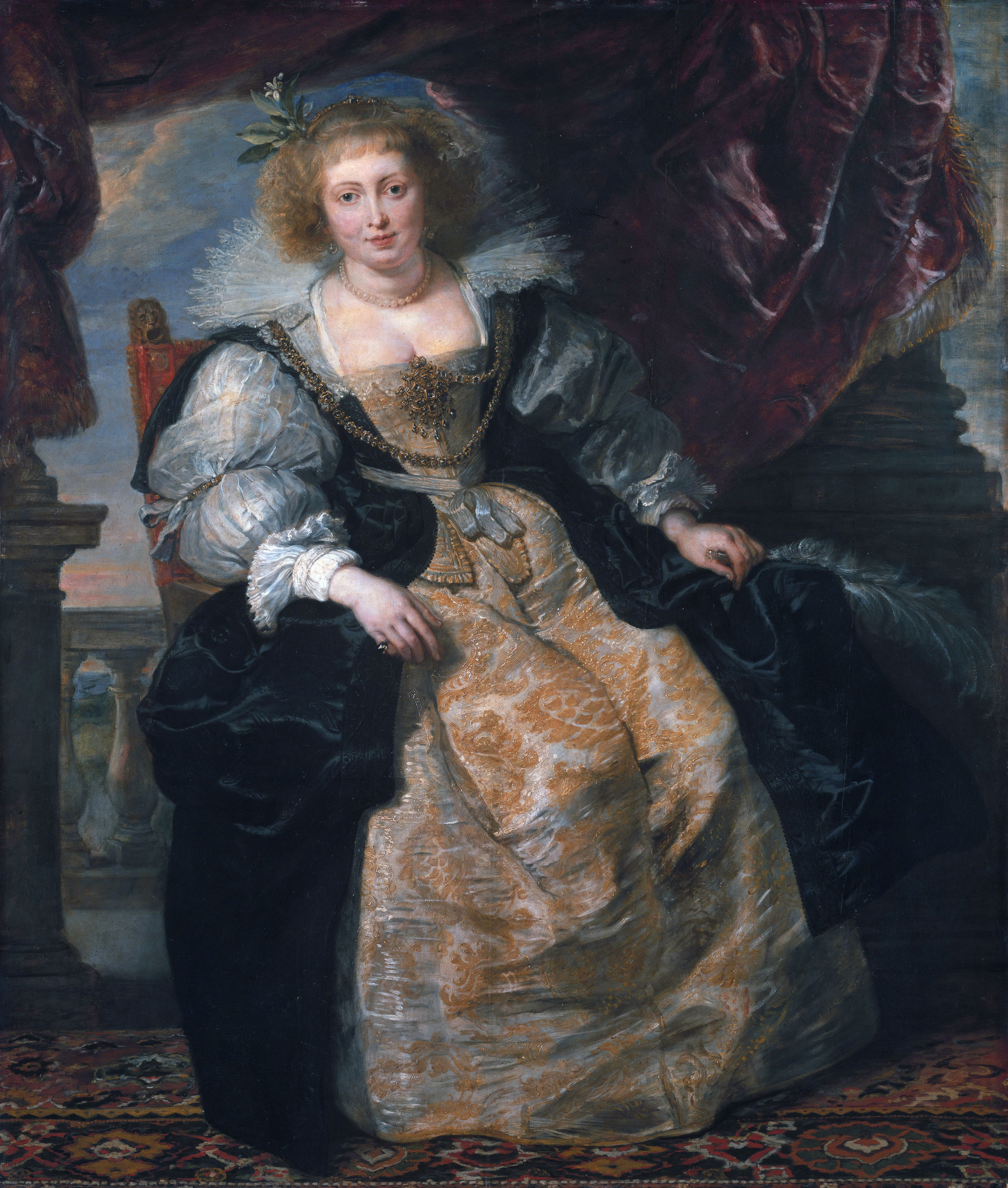
Helena Fourment by Rubens, c. 1630, Alte Pinakothek

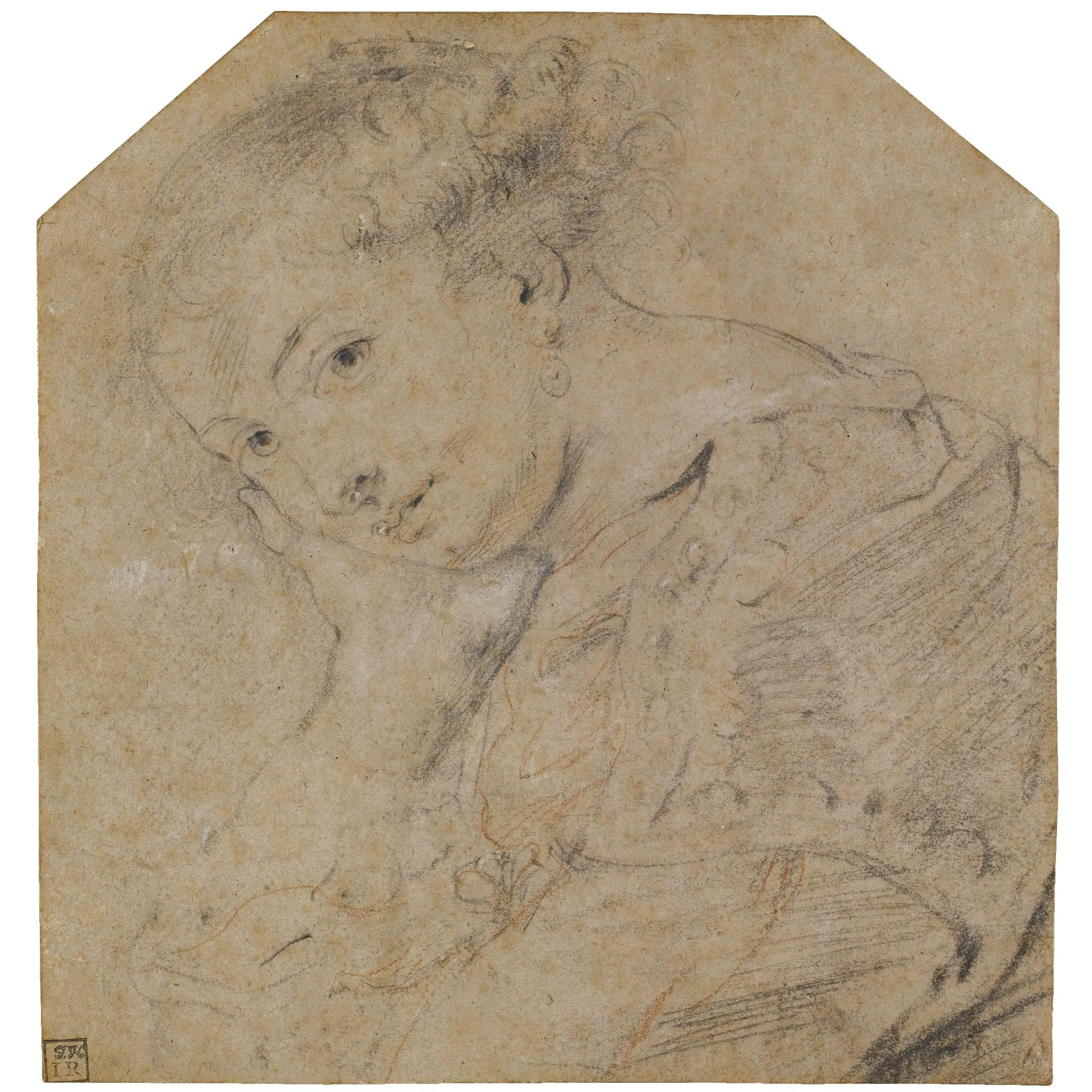
Helena Fourment by Rubens, c. 1630, Cook collection

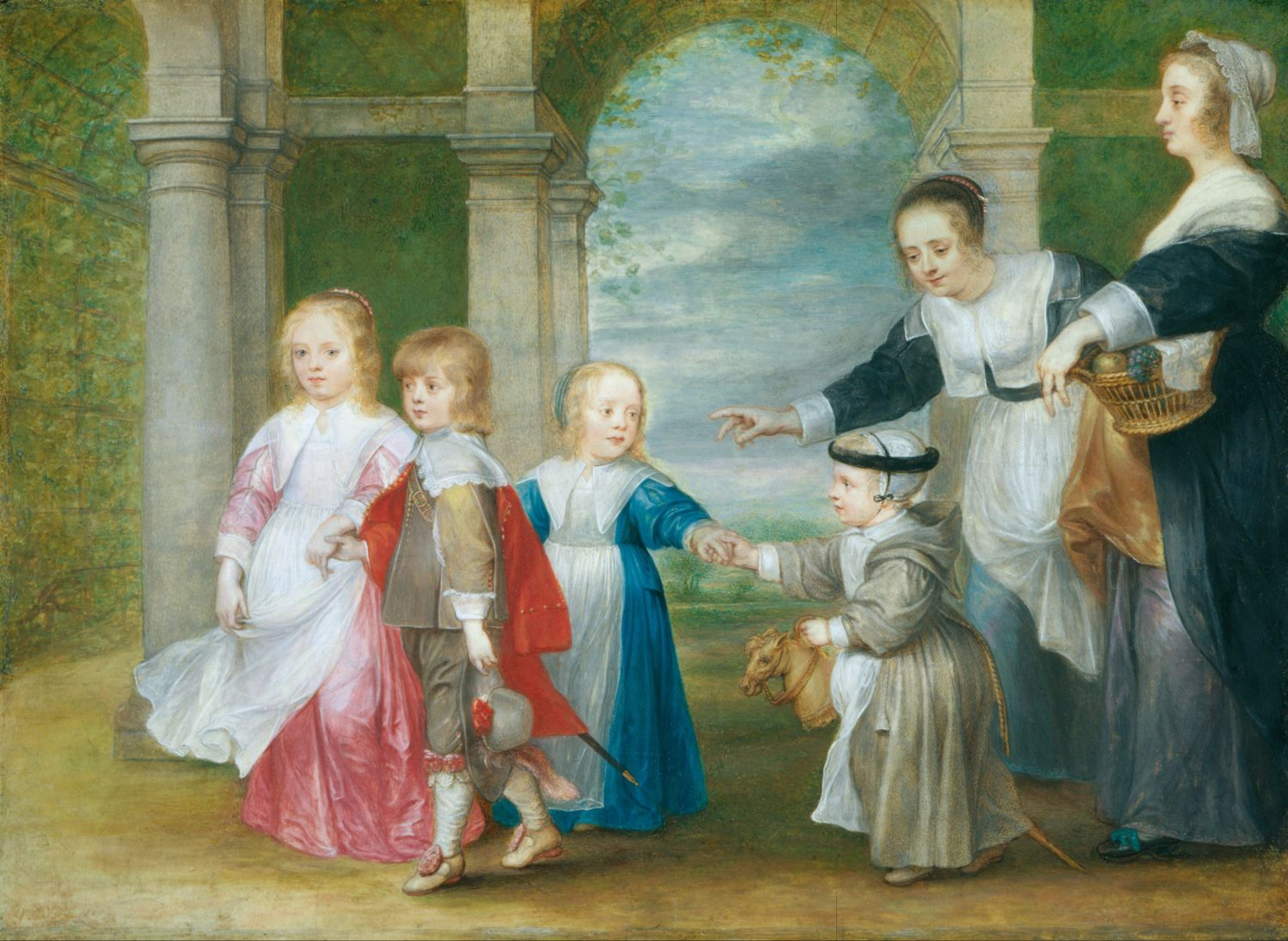
The four children of Rubens and Helena Fourment with maids by Philip Fruytiers, circa 1638-9, Royal Collection

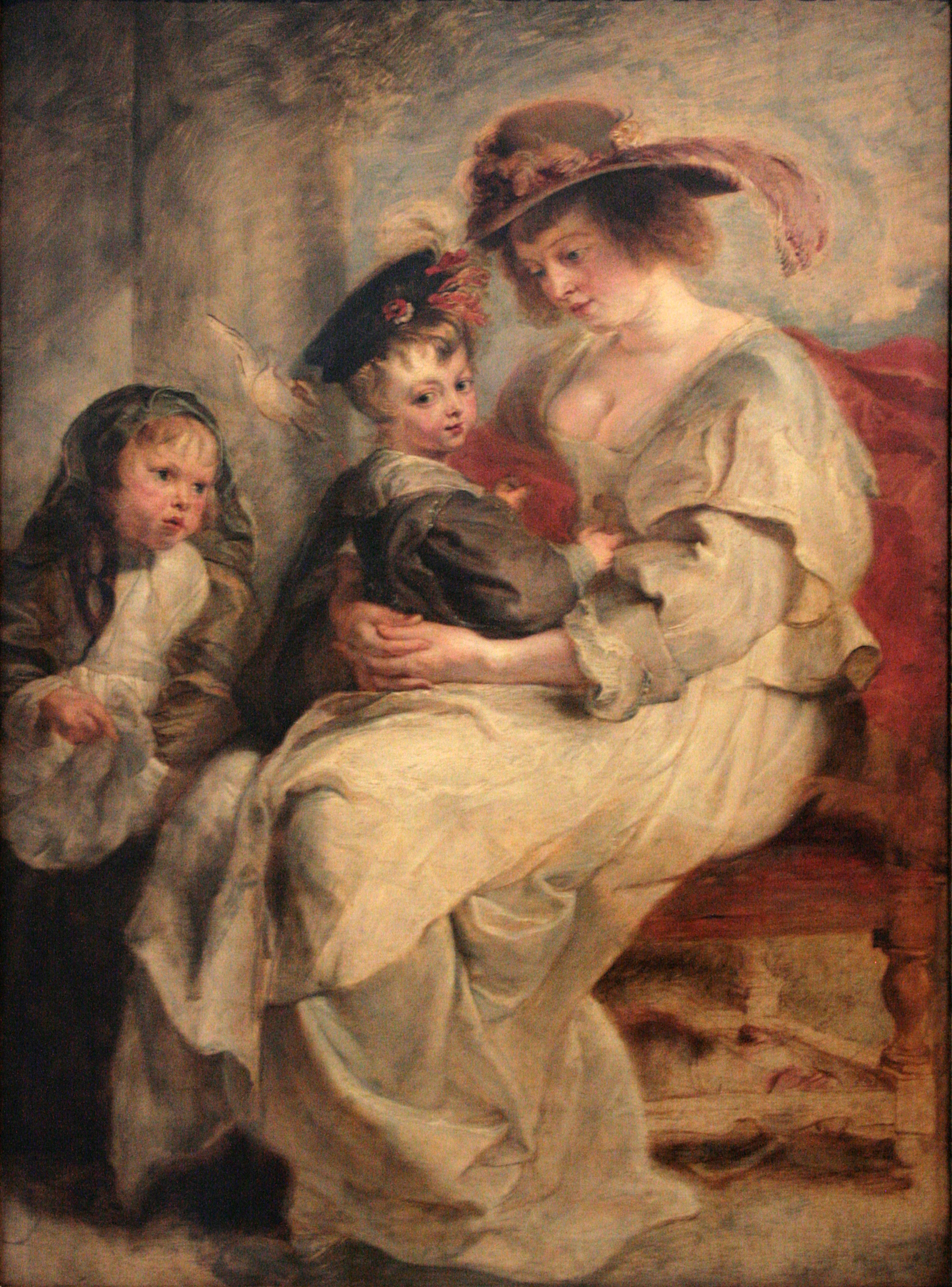
Helena Fourment with two of her children by Rubens, c. 1635, Louvre

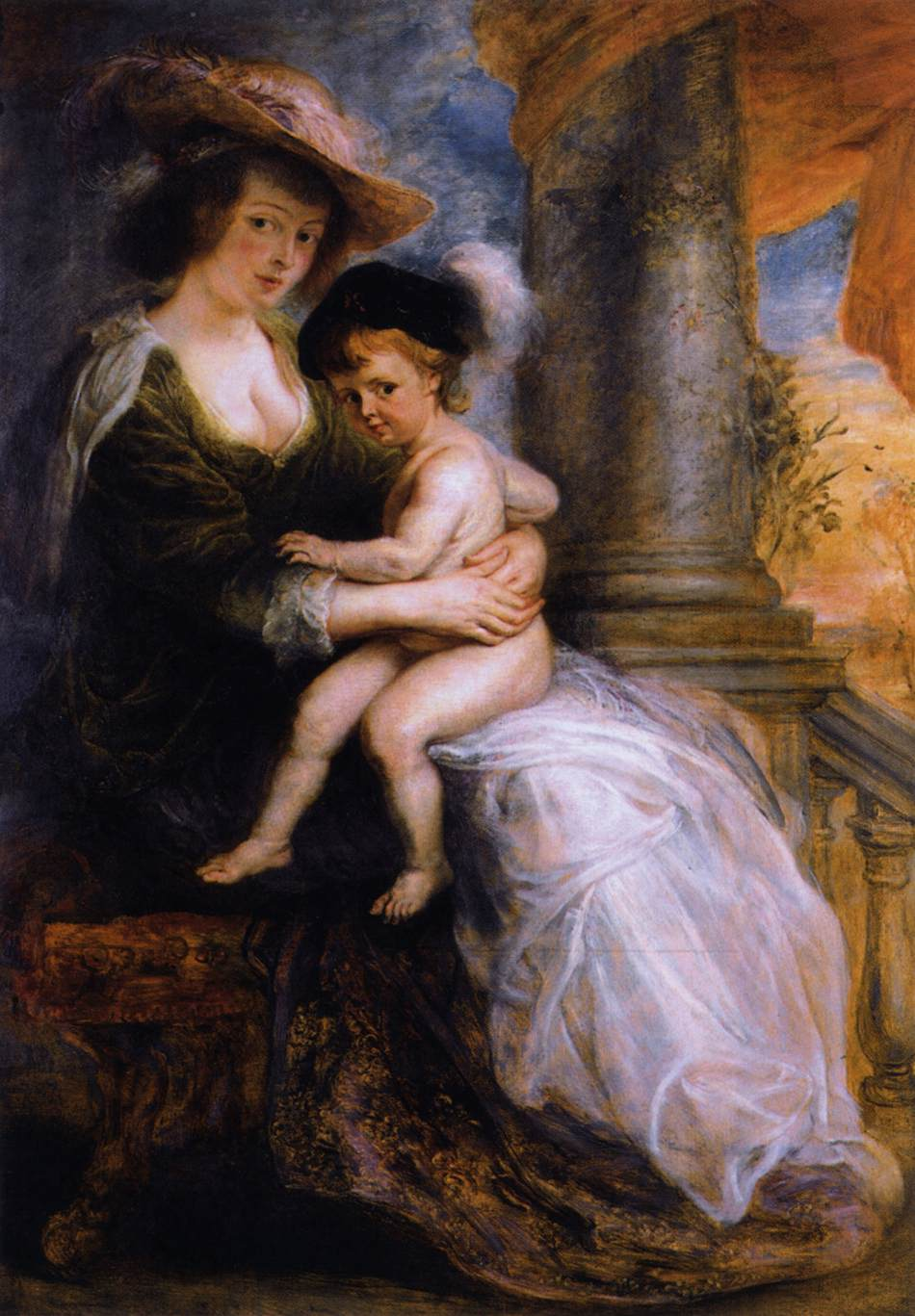
Helena Fourment with her Son Frans by Rubens, c. 1634–1635, Alte Pinakothek

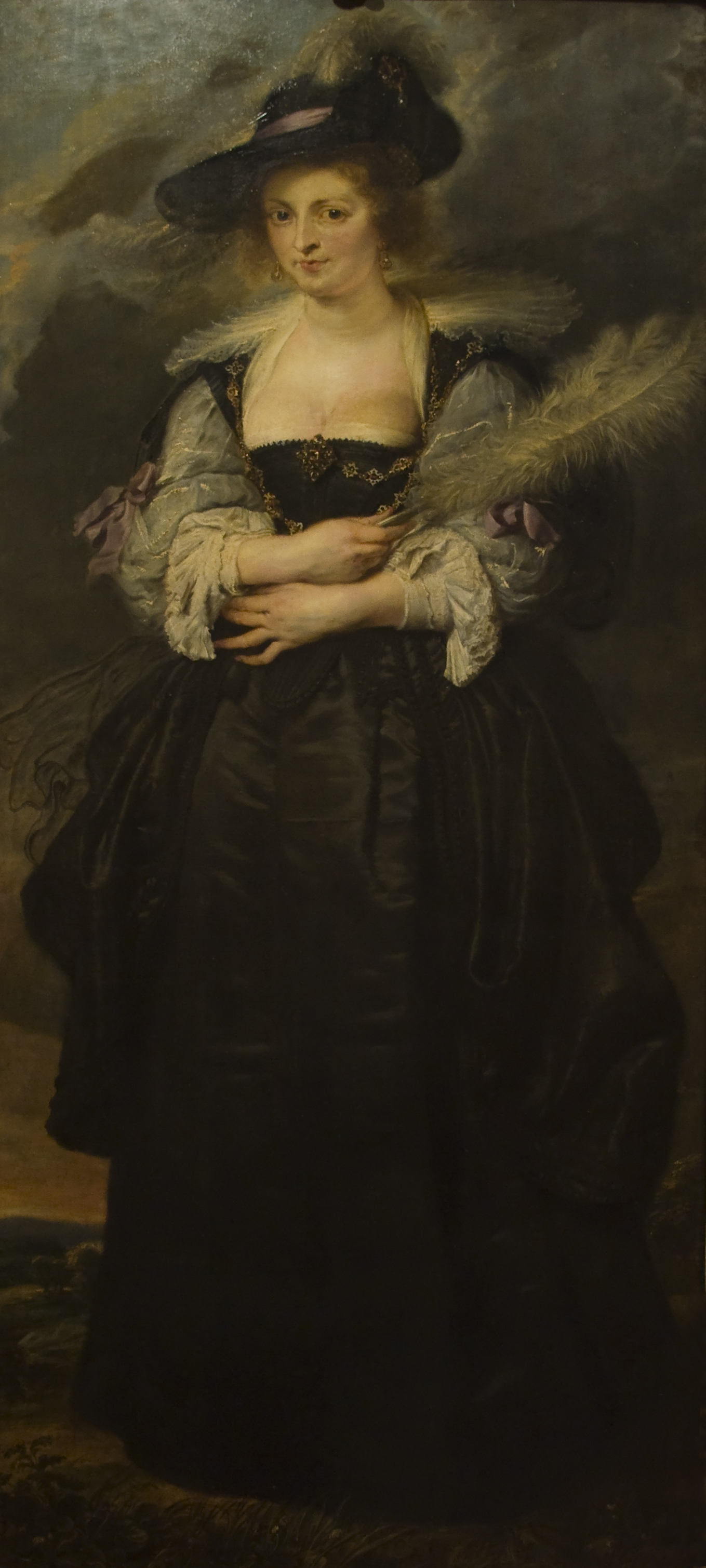
Portrait of Helena Fourment, c. 1638, Museu Calouste Gulbenkian

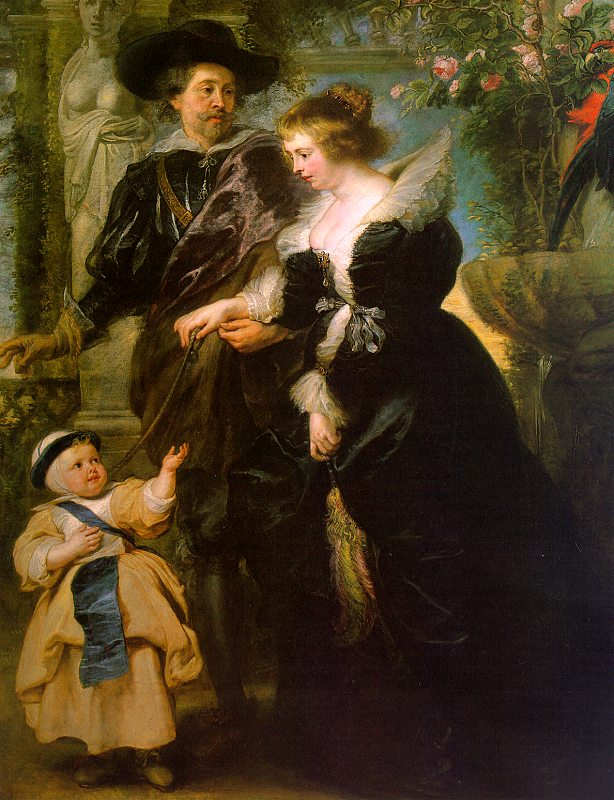
Rubens with Helena Fourment and their son Peter Paul by Rubens, 1639, Metropolitan Museum of Art

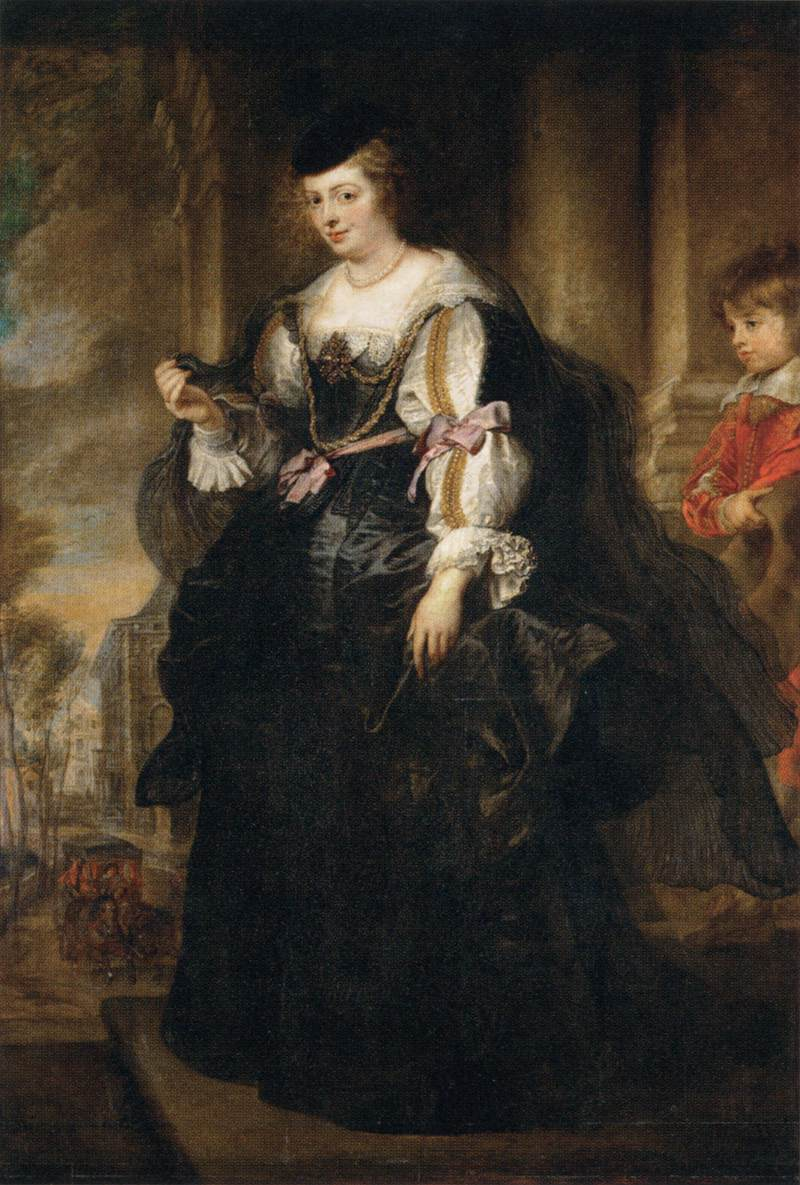
Helena Fourment with a Carriage by Rubens, 1639

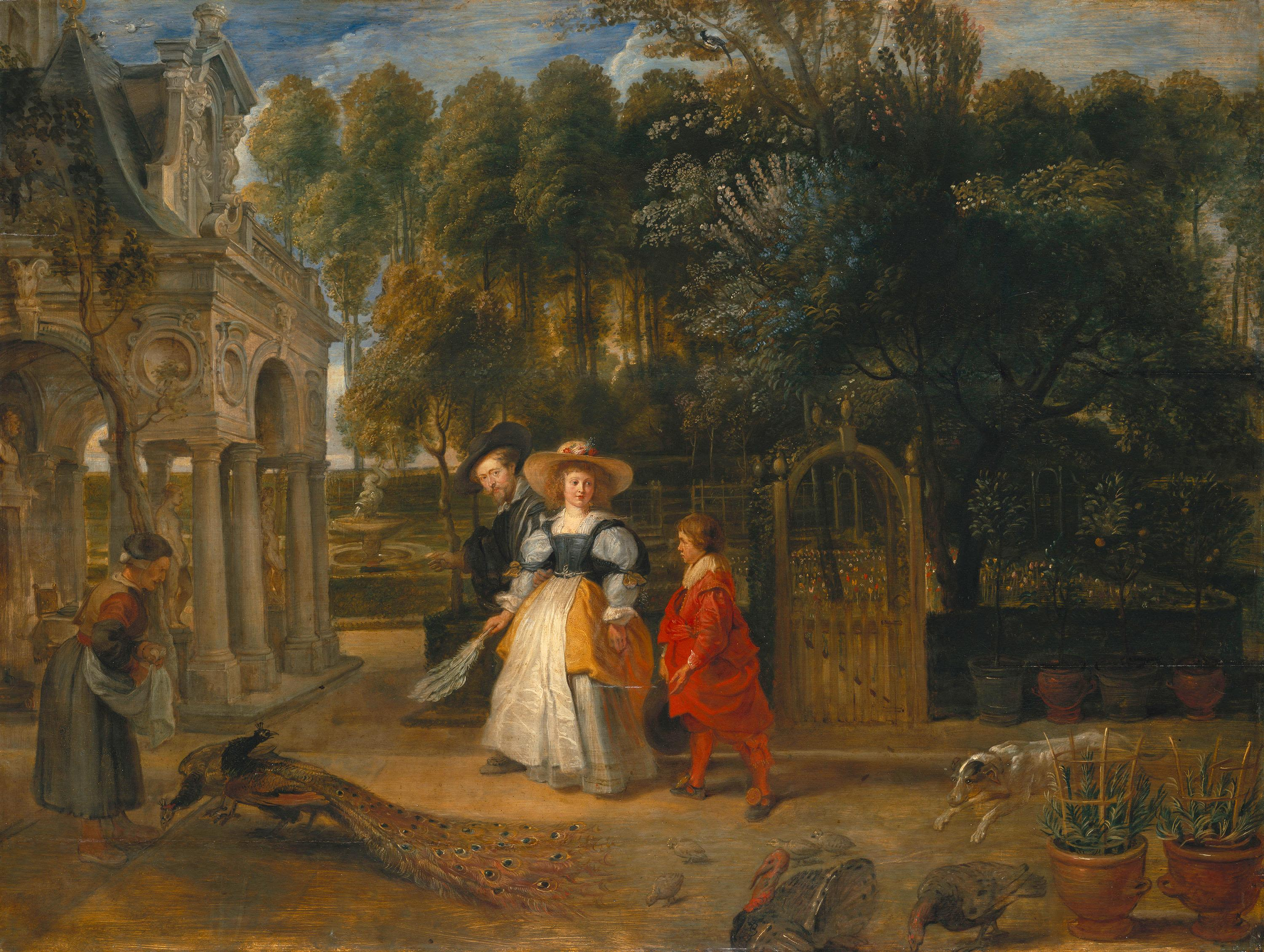
Helena Fourment with her first husband Rubens and their child Nicolaas by Rubens
- Helena Fourment in wedding dress, Munich, Alte Pinakothek, 1630–1631; a studio copy of this work is in the collection of the Rijksmuseum
- Portrait of Helena Fourment with a glove, Munich, Alte Pinakothek (same as above?)
- Helena Fourment with her eldest son Frans, 1635, Munich, Alte Pinakothek
- Rubens and Helena Fourment walking in their garden, Munich
- Helena Fourment with her children Clara, Johanna and Frans, 1636-1637, Louvre
- Helena Fourment and Frans Rubens, Louvre
- Rubens, his wife Helena Fourment, and their son Peter Paul, c. 1639, Metropolitan Museum of Art
- Portrait of Helena Fourment(?) a studio work in the collection of the Royal Museum of Fine Arts in Brussels
- Portrait of Helena Fourment(?) a 17th-century work from Antwerp, Rubenshuis

==== Model ====
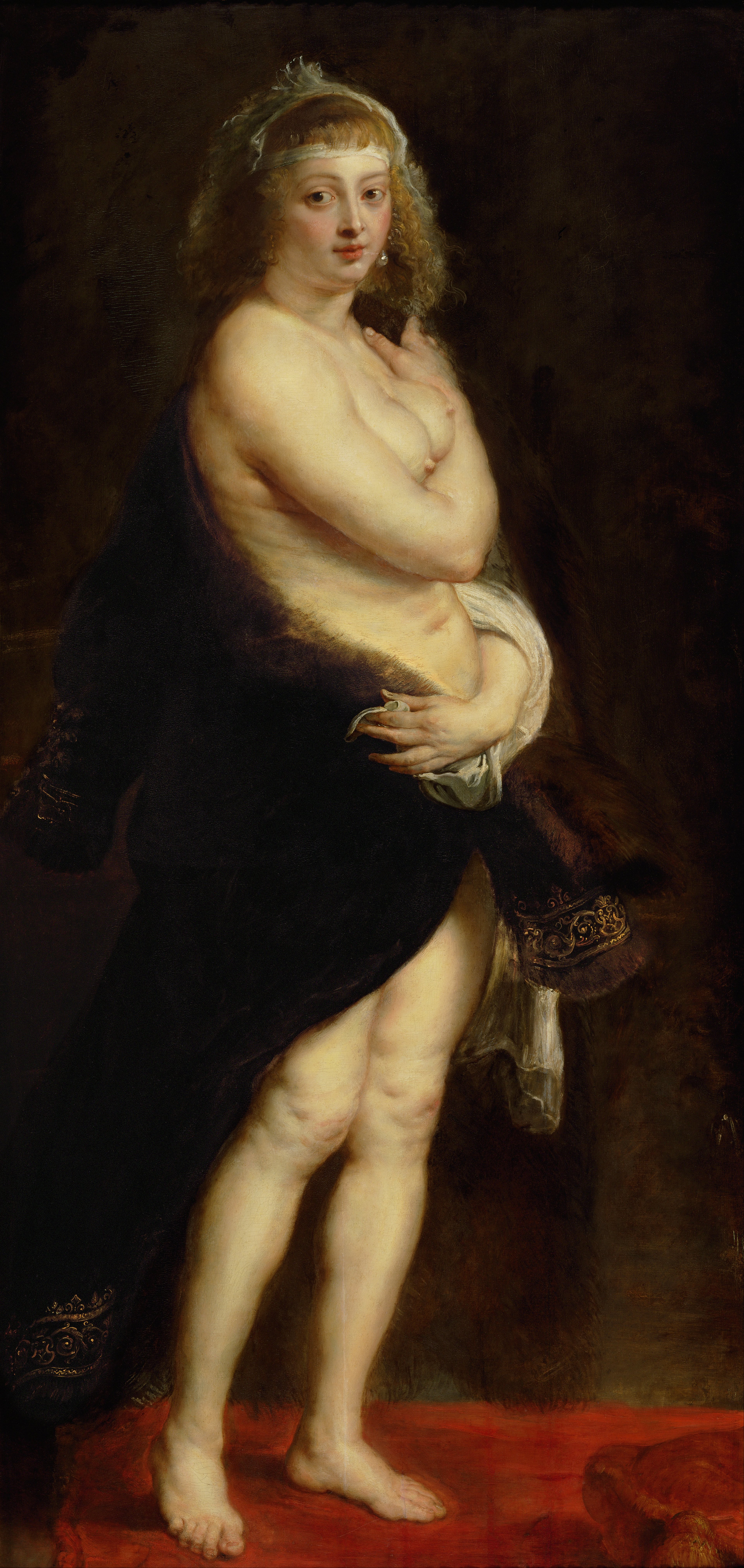
Helena Fourment in a Fur Wrap, also known as Het Pelsken by Rubens, 1636-1638, Kunsthistorisches Museum

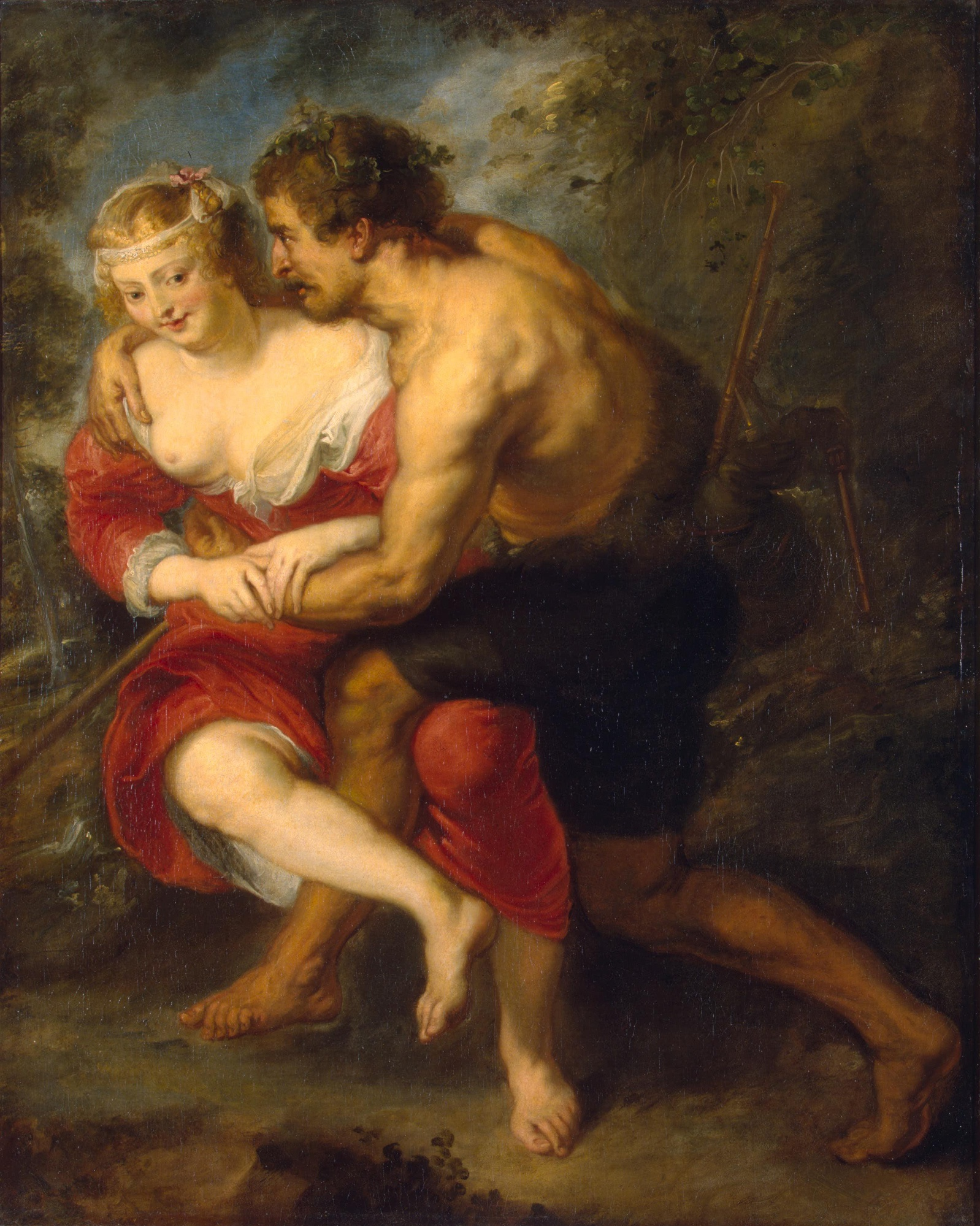
Pastoral Scene

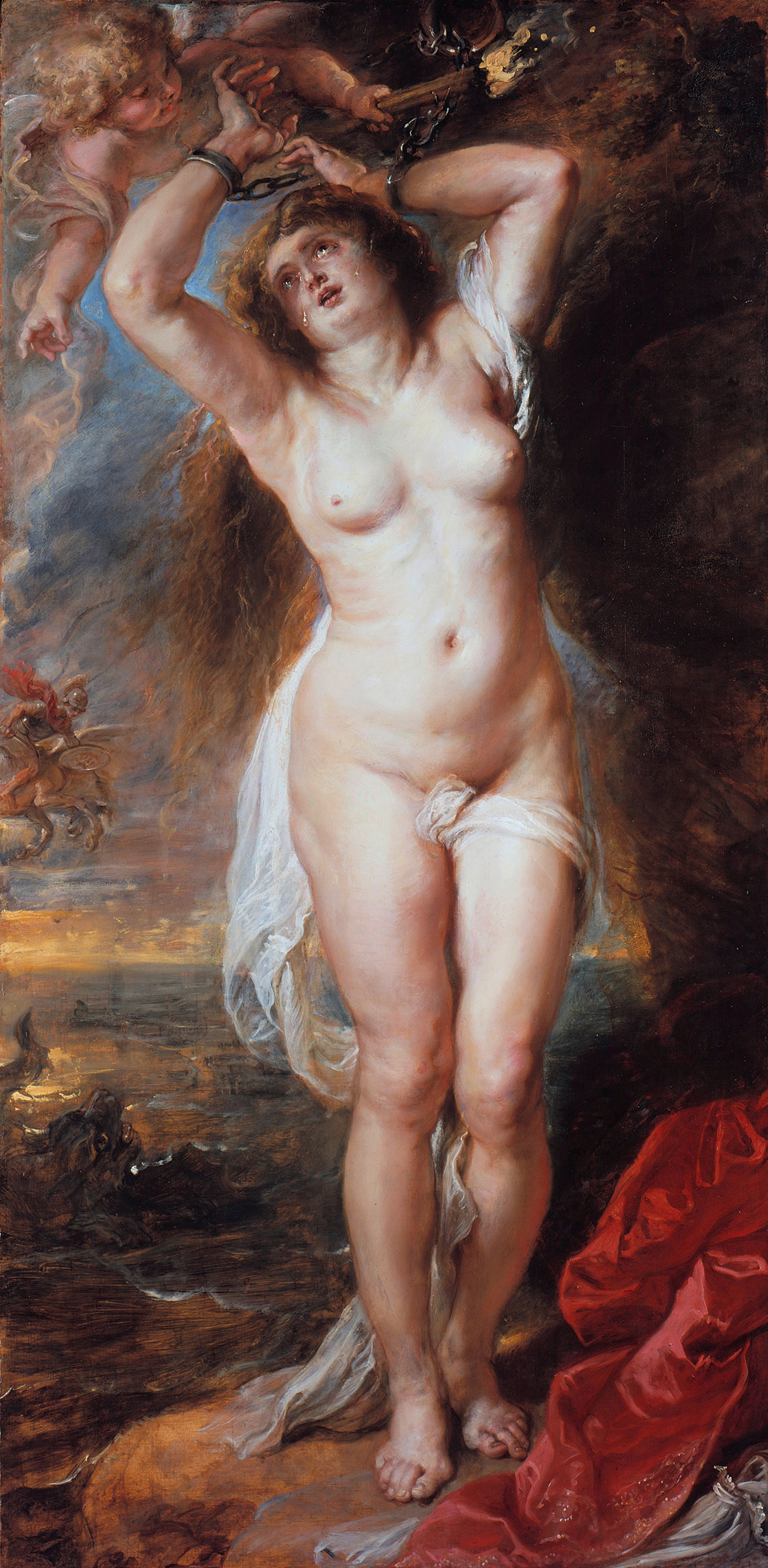
Andromeda

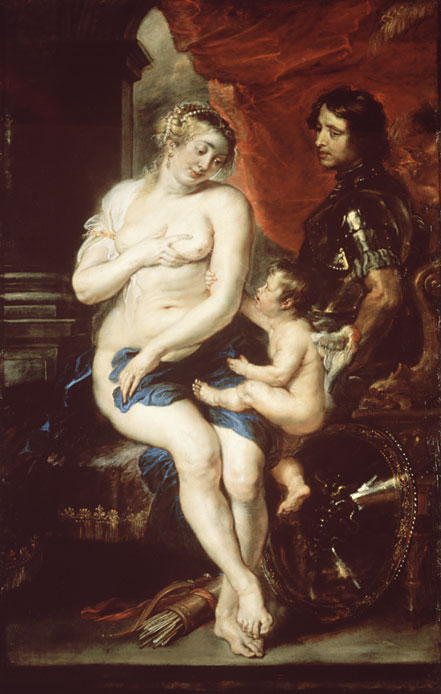
Venus, Mars and Cupid

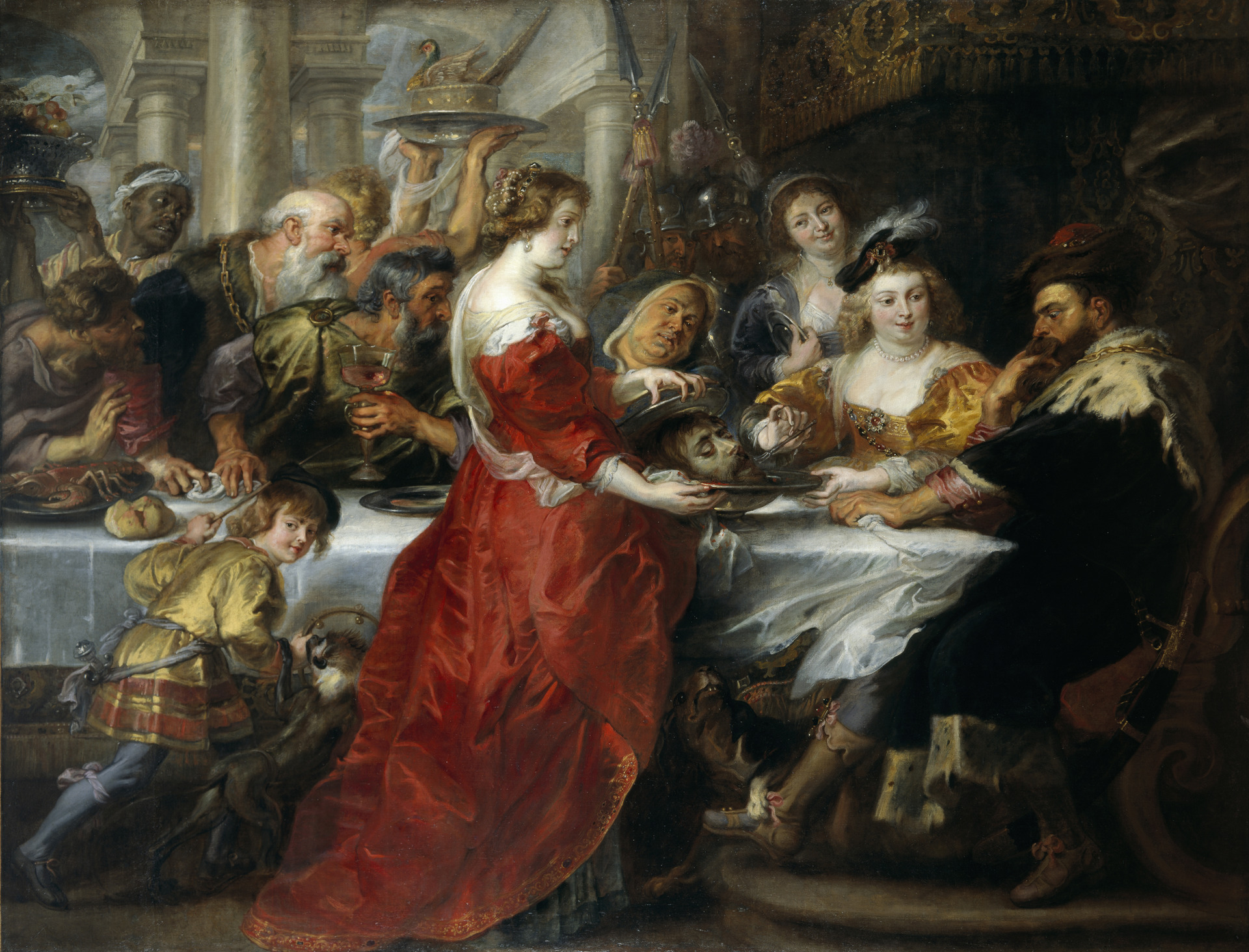
The feast of Herodes and Salome

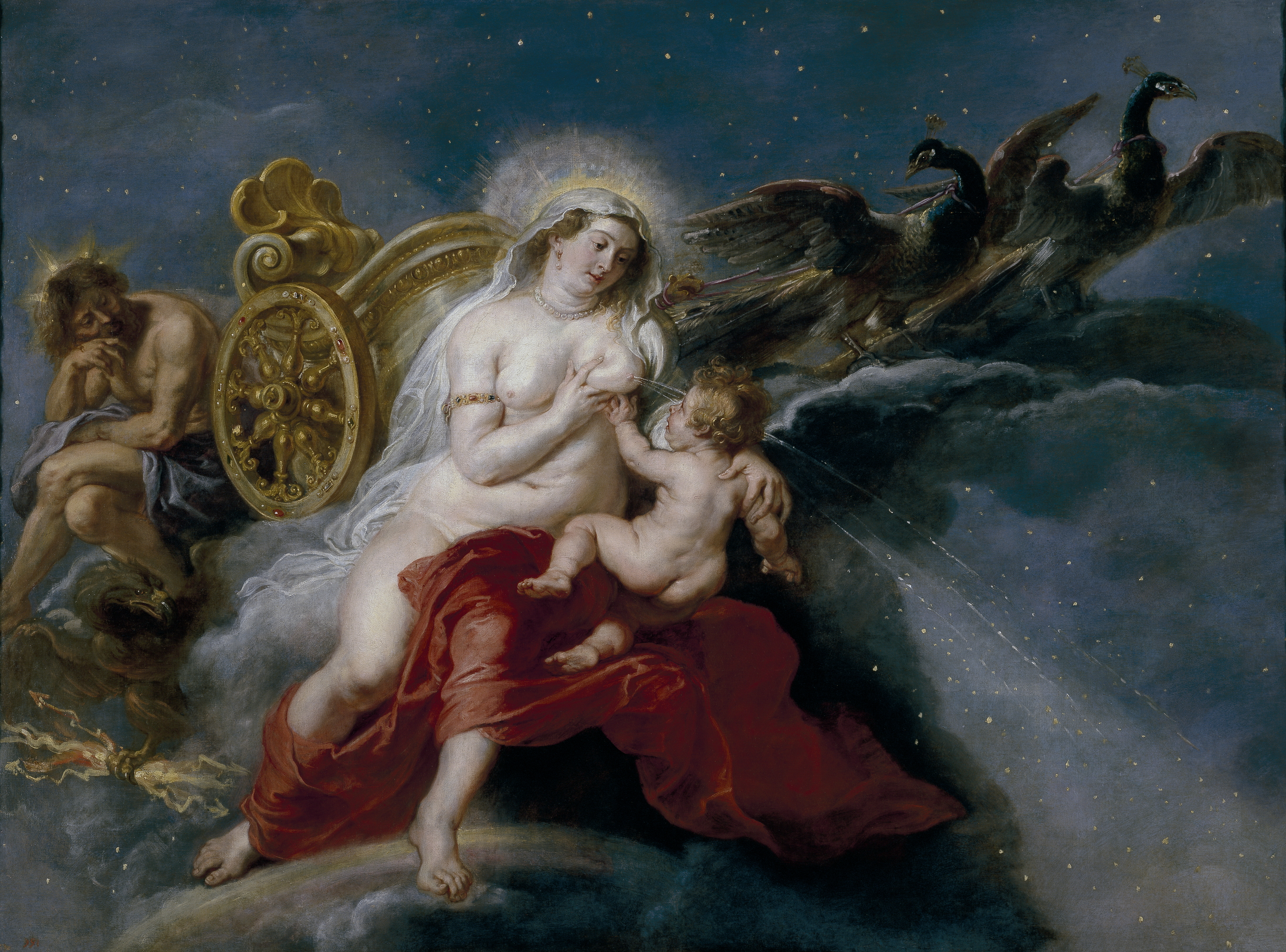
The Origin of the Milky Way

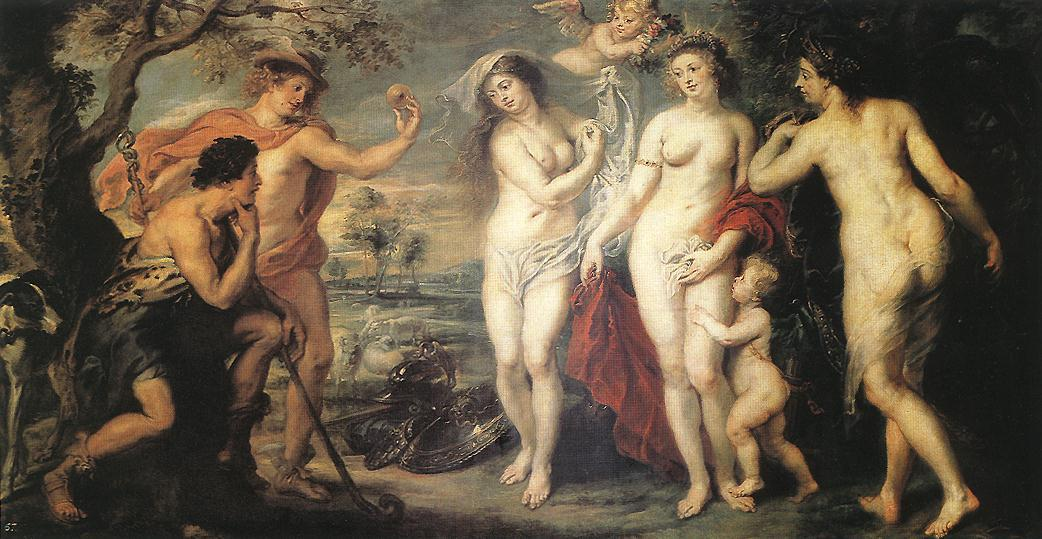
Judgment of Paris

The Three Graces

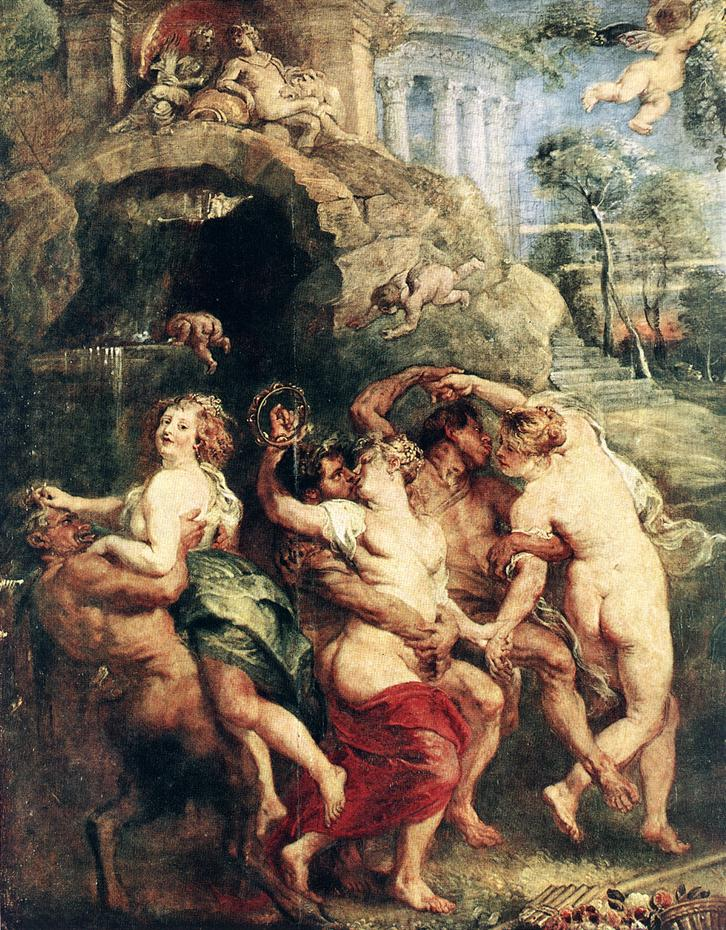
Feast of Venus (detail)
- Judgment of Paris, Museo del Prado (the Venus-figure is modelled on Helena Fourment)
- The Garden of Love, Prado, 1630–1633
- Het Pelsken, 1638, Kunsthistorisches Museum, Vienna
- The Origin of the Milky Way, c. 1637

=== Siblings: Clara van Hecke née Fourment, and Susanna Lunden née Fourment ===
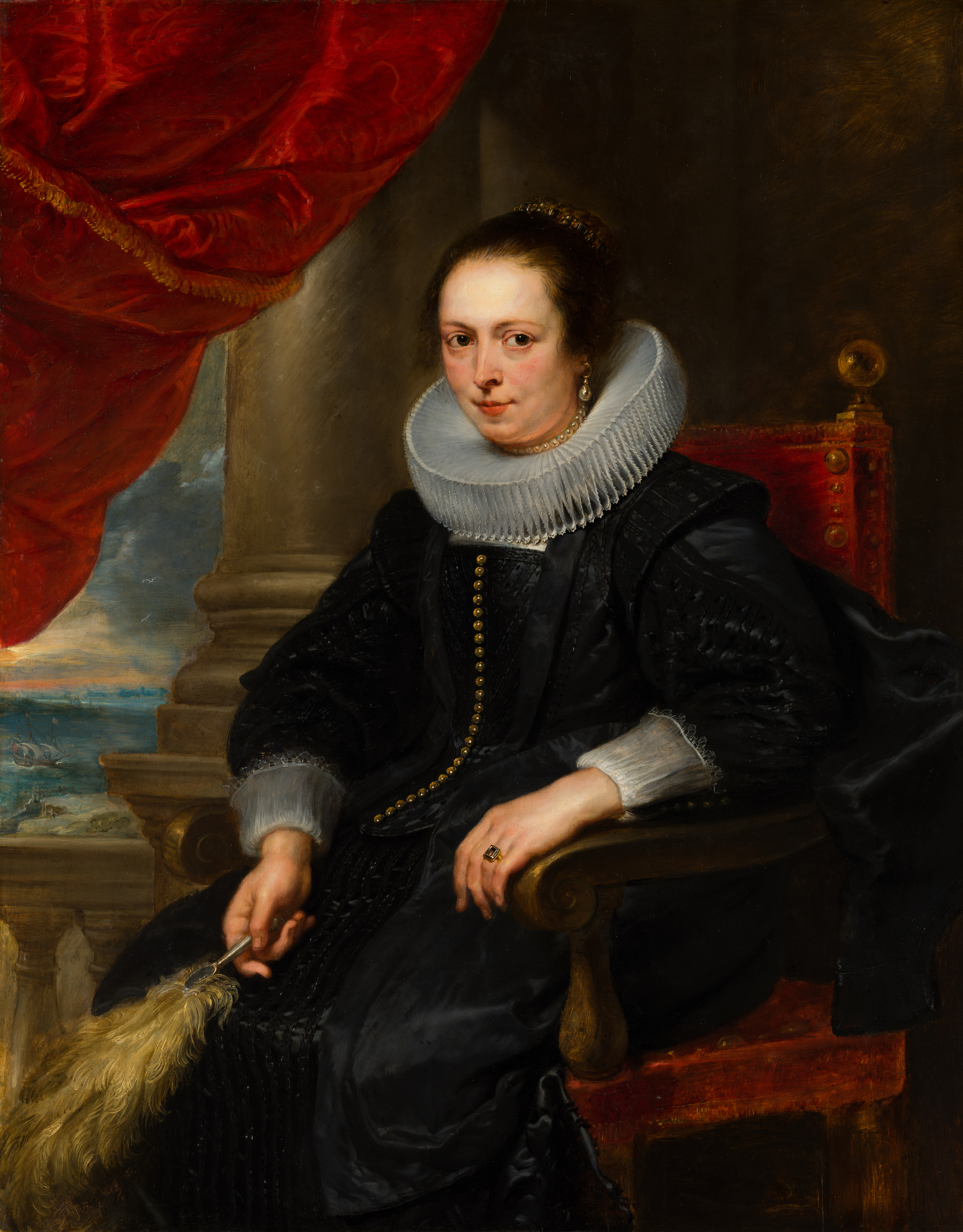
Portrait of a woman, possibly Clara Fourment by Rubens, c. 1630, Mauritshuis

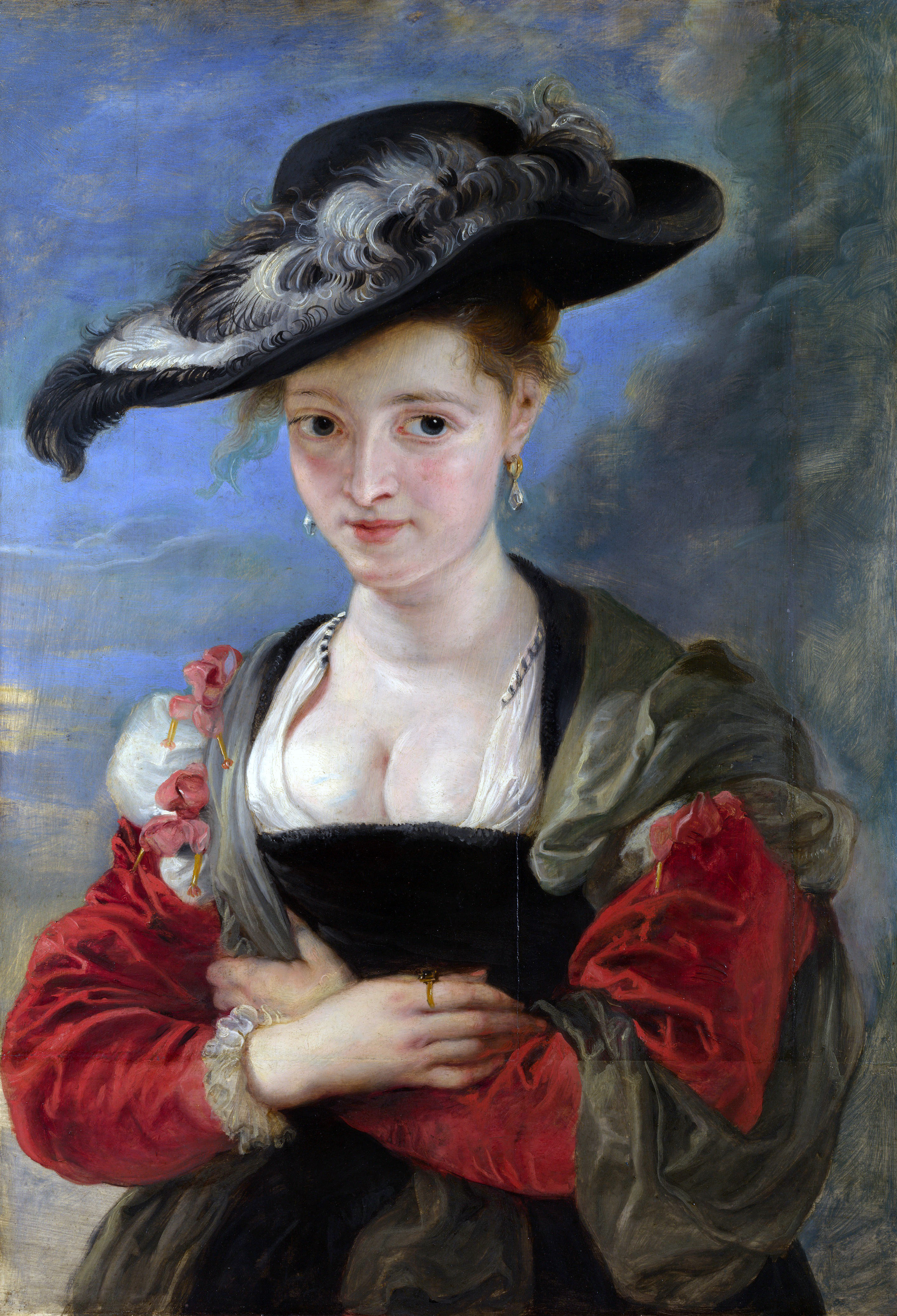
The Felt Hat, probably a portrait of Susanna Fourment by Rubens, c. 1622, National Gallery

Susanna Fourment and her daughter by Anthony van Dyck, 1621, the National Gallery of Art
