= Saint Oda =

Eighth-century saint

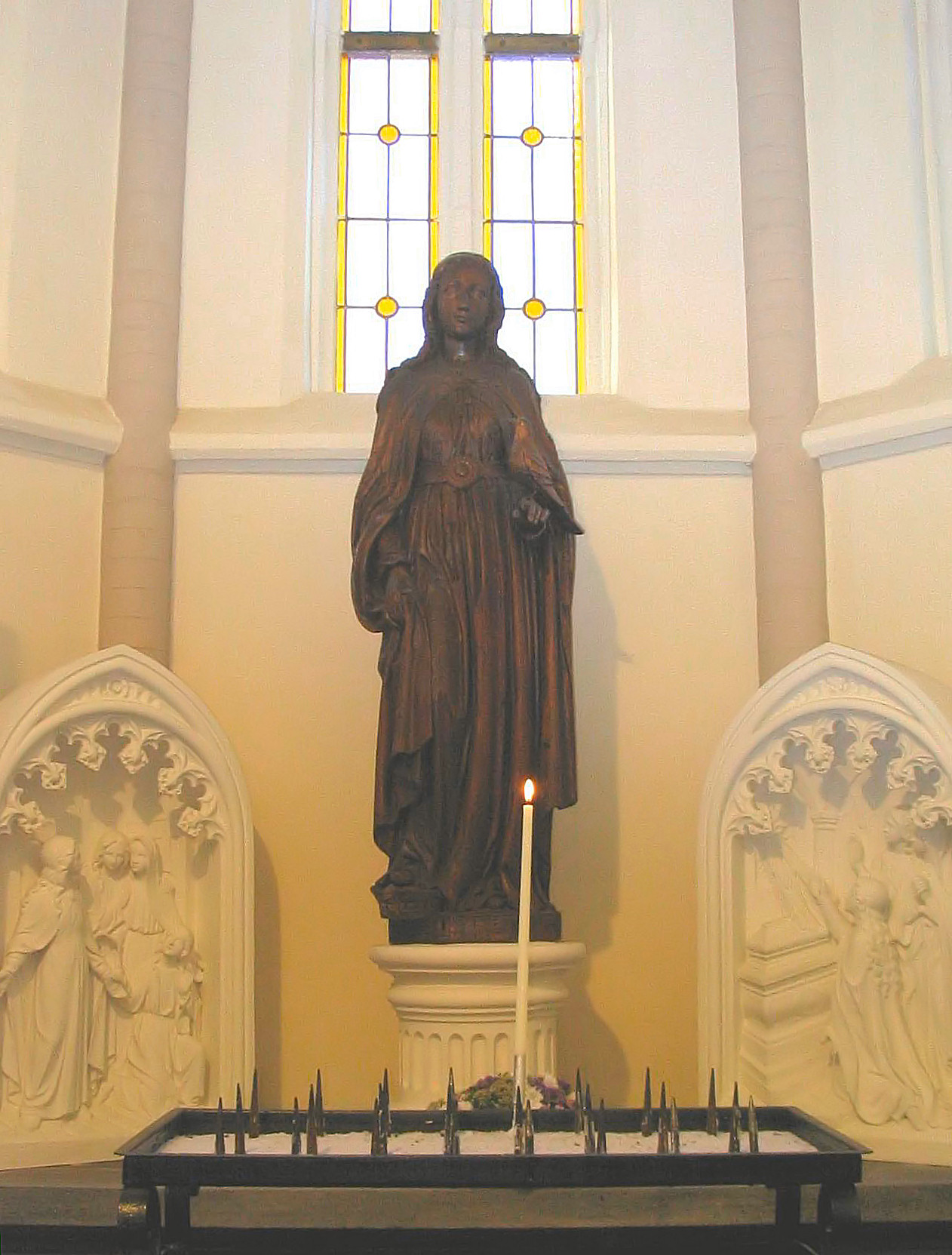
- Chapel of Saint Oda, Sint-Oedenrode
- Born: c. 680; Scotland
- Died: c. 726
- Venerated in: Eastern Orthodox Church, Roman Catholic Church
- Feast: 23 October
- Attributes: Long blue gown with one bare shoulder; carries a staff or a book; always shown with a magpie on her hand and a crown under her feet

Saint Oda of Scotland (c. 680 – c. 726) was a woman, supposedly of Scottish origin, who became a holy recluse in the Netherlands. Her feast day is 23 October.

== Life ==
Oda was born blind and her father sent her on pilgrimage to Liège to visit the relics of Saint Lambert. While praying at his grave she was miraculously cured of her blindness, as recorded in the saint's eighth century vitae. Vowing to dedicate her life to God, she returned to Scotland.

According to records written in the thirteenth century by members of the noble Van Rode family, her father wanted to arrange a marriage for her. Because of her vow she and her maid fled across the North Sea. After a pilgrimage to Rome and Monte Sant'Angelo sul Gargano, Oda prayed in various villages in the Netherlands and Belgium and finally settled in Venray, only to be repeatedly disturbed by magpies. Seeking solitude, she fled from the magpies and the birds led her to an open space in the forest. There the villagers built a hut for her.

In order to protect her humble shelter from the wind, hail, rain and snow and to hide it from the view of the world, Oda planted some bushes. The following day they had already grown into a thick hedge. Her father sought for her, and as in the story of St. Dymphna, her location was disclosed by her use of coins from her homeland. However, when he attempted to approach her hut, magpies repeatedly drove him off. Eventually he gave up and returned to Scotland without her. She remained there as a hermitess.

== Iconography ==
Saint Oda is usually depicted wearing a long blue gown with one shoulder bare and carrying a staff or a book (symbolic of her cured blindness). She is always shown with a magpie on her hand and a crown under her feet (symbolic of her rejection of her earthly father's kingdom).

Sint-Oedenrode flag

== Veneration ==
After Oda's death, her humble hut became a place of pilgrimage. "Saint Oda's place in the woods" became the town of Sint-Oedenrode, Netherlands (in Dutch, a small manmade open space in the woods is called a rode). Like the flag of Scotland, the flag of Sint-Oedenrode is a white saltire on a blue field.

Pieces of Saint Oda's skull and teeth are kept in the Saint Martin Church of Sint-Oedenrode. Various statues and paintings are kept in a chapel dedicated to Oda in the church's garden. Pilgrims visited Saint Oda for relief of sore eyes and other illnesses related to the head.
