= Alexander Rubens, Lord of Vremdyck =

Flemish nobleman (died 1752)

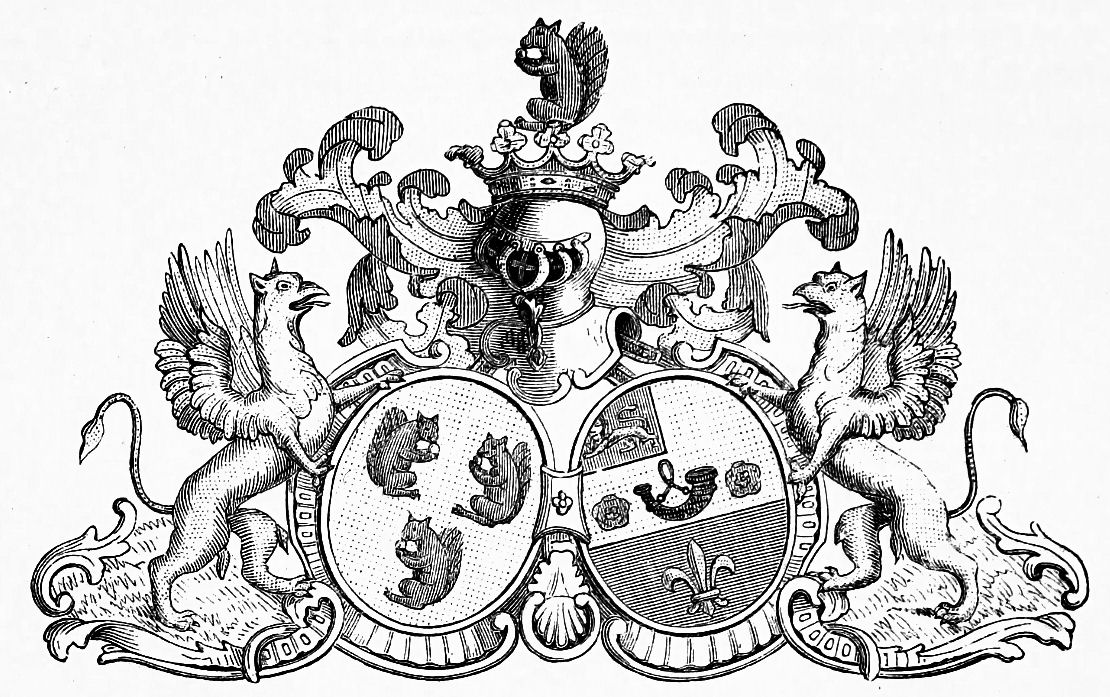
Crest of Rubens van Parys

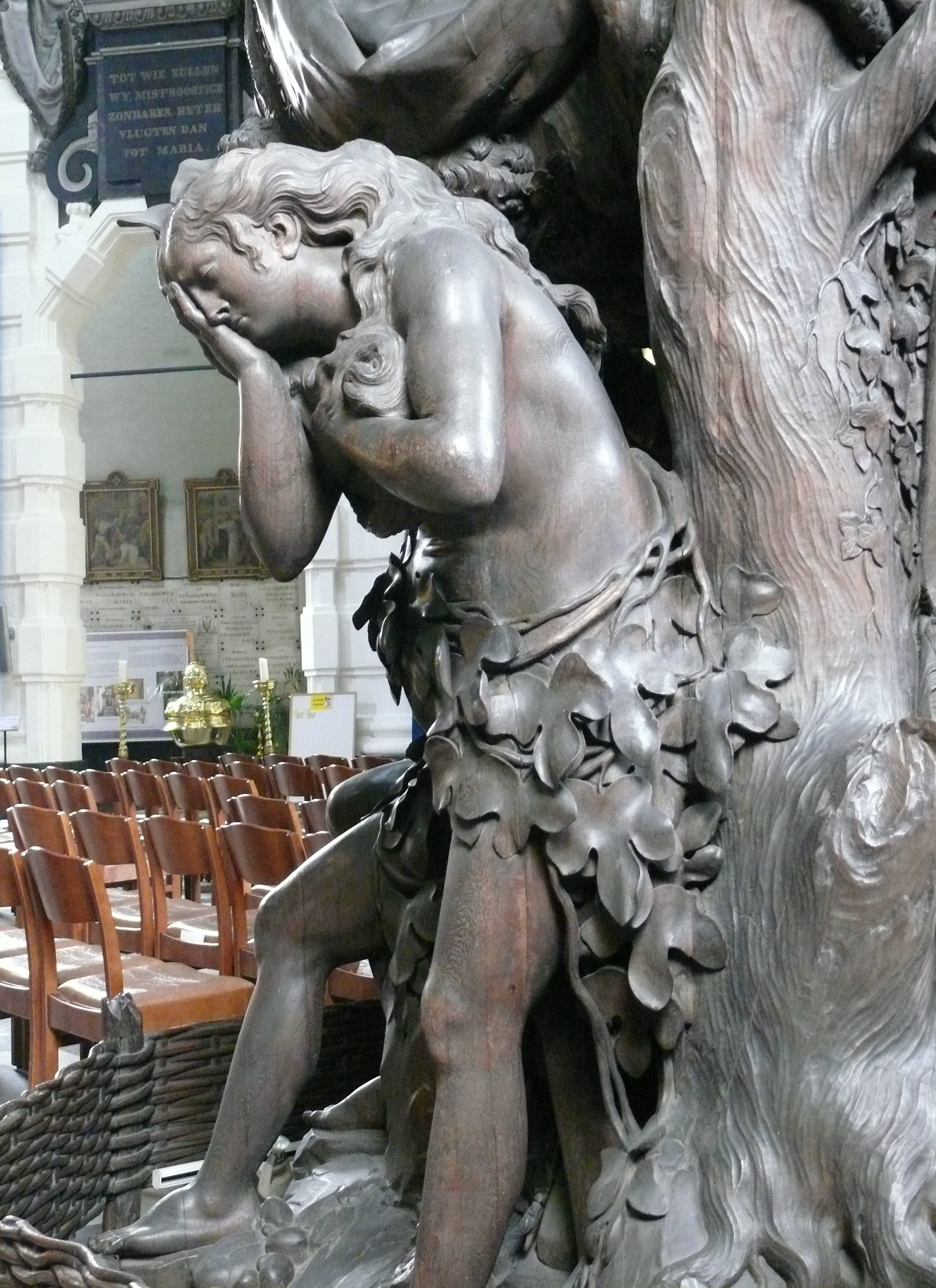
Detail of the pulpit paid for by Alexander Rubens, in Mechelen

Alexander Joseph Rubens, Lord of Vremdyck, Willenskerk, Ter Schriek, Liesele, Malderen and steenhuffel (died 17 February 1752, in Mechelen) was a Flemish nobleman. He was the last male heir of his grandfather.

== Family ==
He was one of the grandchildren of Peter Paul Rubens and Helena Fourment. His father Frans was married to Suzanne Charles, of noble birth. Her uncle Philippe was Knight of Jerusalem. He was widower of Catharyne Philippine van Parys, who died in 1741. He was responsible for Joannes Alexander and Fredericus Ignatius Rubens, orphans of François II Rubens, and Barbe Francisca de Clear, after his death. Alexander did not have any children. He was buried with his wife in the Saint James' church, Antwerp.

== Career ==
Alexander Rubens was named in 1694 by Royal command Rentmeester-generaal of the King, for Mechelen. He donated from his private fortune for the completion of the Basilica of Our Lady of Hanswijk, he donated the pulpit by private gift of 2.994 gulden. He resided in Liezele castle, bought in 1716.

== Ancestors ==
16. Bartholomaeus I Rubens
8. Jan Rubens
17. Barbara Arents
4. Peter Paul Rubens
18. Henry Pypelinckx
9. Maria Pypelinckx
19. Claire of Touion, dite Colyns.
2. François I Rubens
20. Joannes Fourment
10. Daniël Fourment
21. Joanna Bulteau
5. Helena Fourment
22. Peter Stappaert
11. Clara Stappaert
23. Catharine le Moisne
1. Alexander Rubens, Lord of Vremdyck
24. Balthasar Charles
12. Gaspar Charles
25. Catherine de Solbreucq
6. John Maria Charles
26. Roland de Tournon; Lord of Walbourg
13. Marie de Tournon
27. Mary Hallut
3. Susanne Gratienne Charles
28. Jacques Roelants
14. Jacques Roelants, esq.
29. Elisabeth van der Muyden
7. Isabella Clara Roelants
30. Pierre de Schott
15. Mary de Schotte, dite Douglas
31. Magdalena Ruts
