= Self-Portrait in a Straw Hat =

Painting by Élisabeth Vigée Le Brun

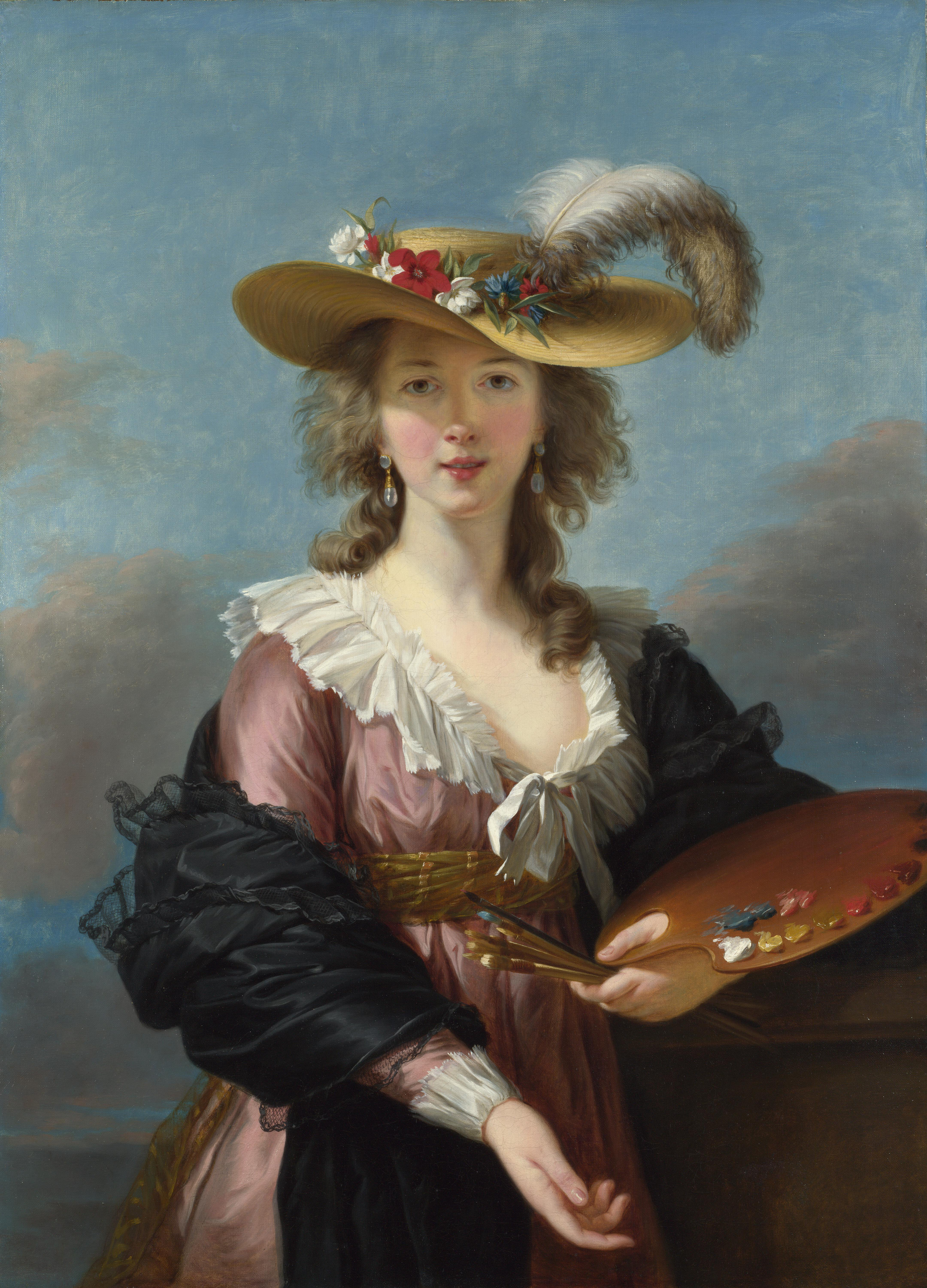
- Artist: Élisabeth Vigée Le Brun
- Year: c. 1782
- Medium: Oil on canvas
- Dimensions: 97.8 cm × 70.5 cm (38.5 in × 27.8 in)
- Location: National Gallery, London

Self-Portrait in a Straw Hat (French: Autoportrait au chapeau de paille, Dutch: Zelfportret met strohoed) is a self-portrait by the French painter Élisabeth Vigée Le Brun, painted after 1782, in oil on linen, measuring 97.8 by 70.5 centimetres. It has belonged to the collection of the National Gallery, in London, since 1897.

== Context ==
In her memoirs Vigée Le Brun stated that the painter Claude Joseph Vernet advised her to study the Flemish masters. In 1782 she went to Brussels, Amsterdam and Antwerp with her husband, and saw Peter Paul Rubens' portrait of Portrait of Susanna Lunden (aka. Susanna Fourment with a Straw Hat)(circa 1622–1625). (See Gallery below.) This painting deeply impressed her.

"The effect of this painting, is in the two different modes of lighting that create the simple daylight and the sunlight. The painting made such an impression on me that when I painted my own portrait I used the same effects".

She made her first version of "Self-portrait in a straw hat" in Brussels, as a kind of free imitation of Rubens' work. (See Gallery below.)

The painting that is the main subject of this article is a replica of that first version, painted when she was back in Paris. (See Gallery below.)

In the same period she also made a very similar portrait of Yolande de Polastron, the Duchess of Polignac, wearing a similar straw hat. (See Gallery below.)

== Description ==
Self-portrait in a straw hat can be seen primarily as a study of the effect of light, in the spirit of Rubens. Partly because her eyes fall into the shadow of the hat, the viewer's gaze is immediately drawn to the neck lit from below, which widens into her central décolleté. In the other parts of the work she manages to reintroduce the brilliant shine of directly reflected natural light into the spirit of her great example. She shows herself in the open air against a cloud-moving, but calm sky, which contrasts particularly in the colour composition with the multi-coloured depiction of herself as a painter. More than Rubens, who places a strong emphasis on the bosom of his model, she portrays herself as a complete, emancipated personality.

Vigée-Le Brun paints herself as a charming young lady in an unusually natural pose and appearance for the time. She wears neither a corset nor a wig, which was highly unusual in the period so close to the French Revolution. There is no rouge on her cheeks and her hair is not powdered. She looks confidently at the viewer, with penetrating eyes, a small delicate nose and thin lips. The clothing, in a style then called "a la grècque", is fashionable but relatively simple, without baroque props and drapes. She wears earrings with a flamboyant straw hat decorated with flowers and ostrich feathers on her head, which was considered artistic at the time. Palette and brushes indicate her profession, which was exceptional for women at the time.

The soft, flattering style is typical of Vigée Le Brun. However sentimental her self-portrait may seem to contemporary standards, it was considered innovative and modern in her time, mainly because of its natural simplicity. It anticipated the neoclassical portraiture of Jacques-Louis David, which came to predominate in Napoleon's time. Vigée Le Brun, who found her most important patrons among the French aristocracy and in particular also worked for Marie Antoinette, herself fled to Florence, Rome, Vienna and Saint Petersburg after the revolution. She only returned to Paris after the fall of Napoleon in 1815.

== In her own words ==
Vigée Le Brun discussed the 'Straw Hat' painting in her memoirs.

We returned to Flanders to see the masterpieces of Rubens. ... at Antwerp, I found the famous "Straw Hat," which has lately been sold to an Englishman for a large sum. This admirable picture represents a woman by Rubens. It delighted and inspired me to such a degree that I made a portrait of myself at Brussels, striving to obtain the same effects. I painted myself with a straw hat on my head, a feather, and a garland of wild flowers, holding my palette in my hand.

When the portrait was exhibited at the Salon I feel free to confess that it added considerably to my reputation. The celebrated Johann Sebastian Müller made an engraving after it, but it must be understood that the dark shadows of an engraving spoiled the whole effect of such a picture.

Soon after my return from Flanders, the portrait I had mentioned, and several other works of mine, were the cause of Joseph Vernet's decision to propose me as a member of the Académie royale de peinture et de sculpture. Monsieur Jean-Baptiste Marie Pierre, then Premier peintre du Roi (first Painter to the King), made strong opposition, not wishing, he said, that women should be admitted. Although Mme. Anne Vallayer-Coster, who painted flowers beautifully, had already been admitted, and I think Mme. Vien (Marie-Thérèse Reboul) had been, too. Monsieur Pierre, a very mediocre painter, was a clever man. Besides, he was rich, ... His opposition might have become fatal to me if all true picture-lovers had not been associated with the Academy, and if they had not formed a cabal, in my favour, against M. Pierre's. At last I was admitted ...

== Gallery ==
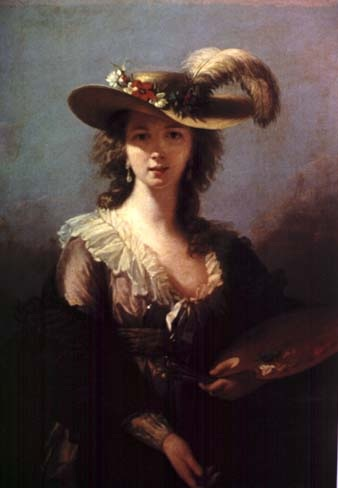
First version, 1782, private property, Switzerland

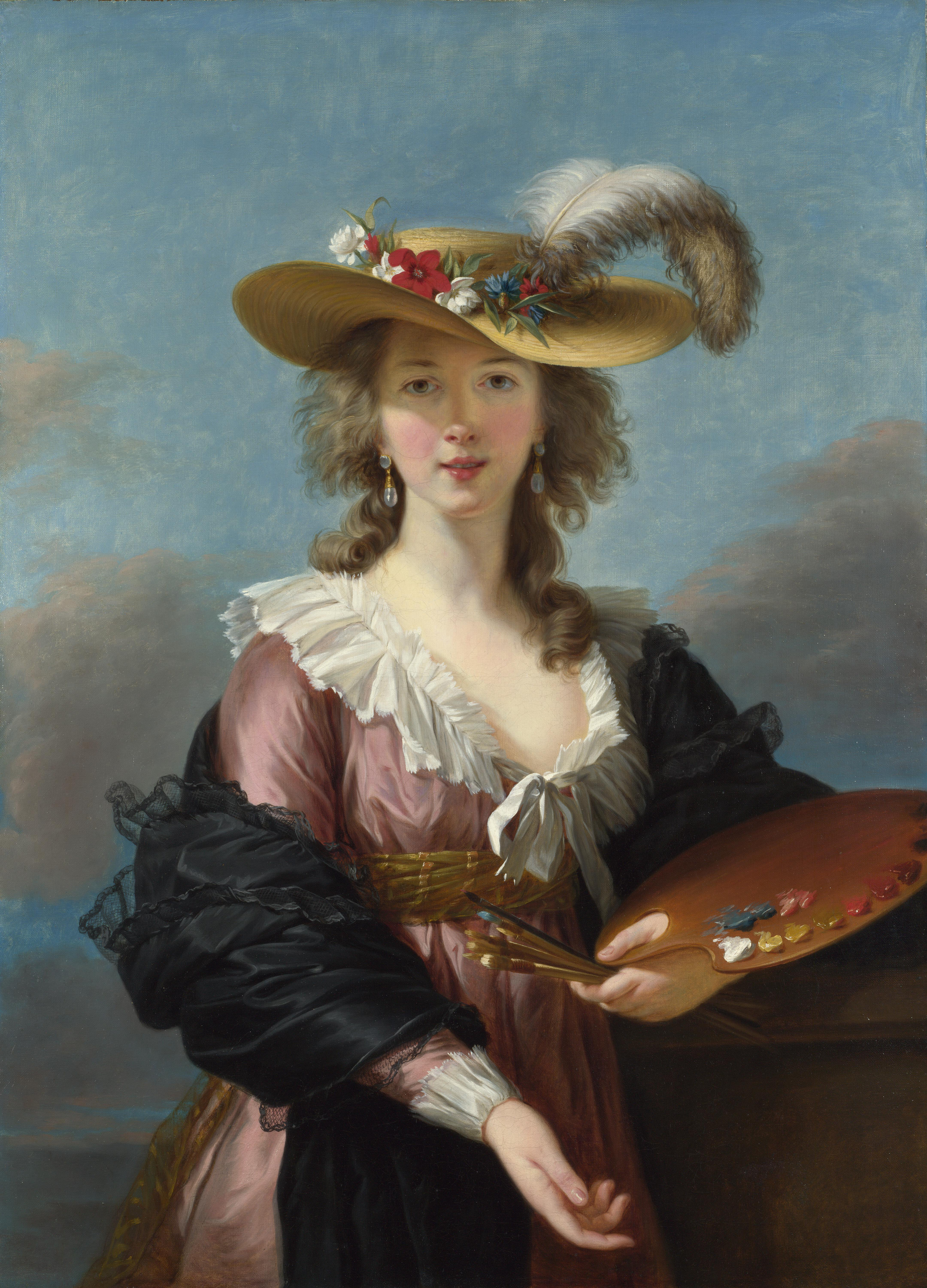
Self-portrait in a Straw Hat, National Gallery, London

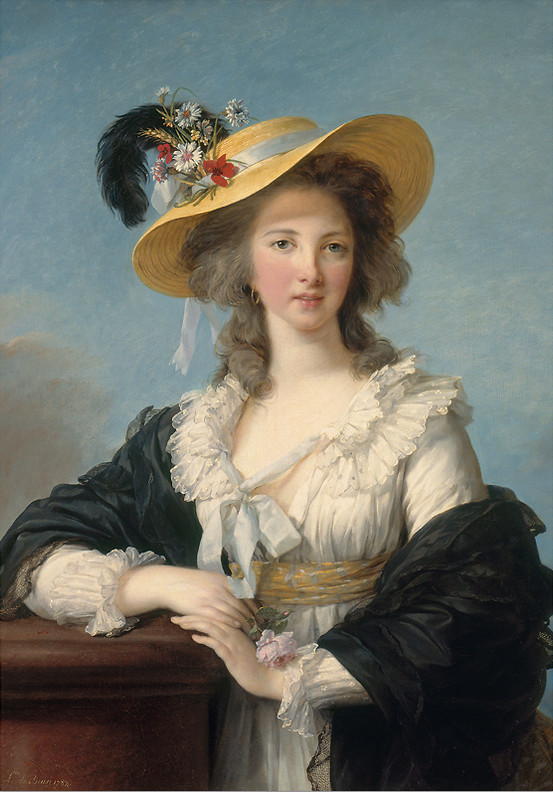
Portrait of the Duchess de Polignac, 1782 oil on canvas. Musée de l'Histoire de France (Versailles).

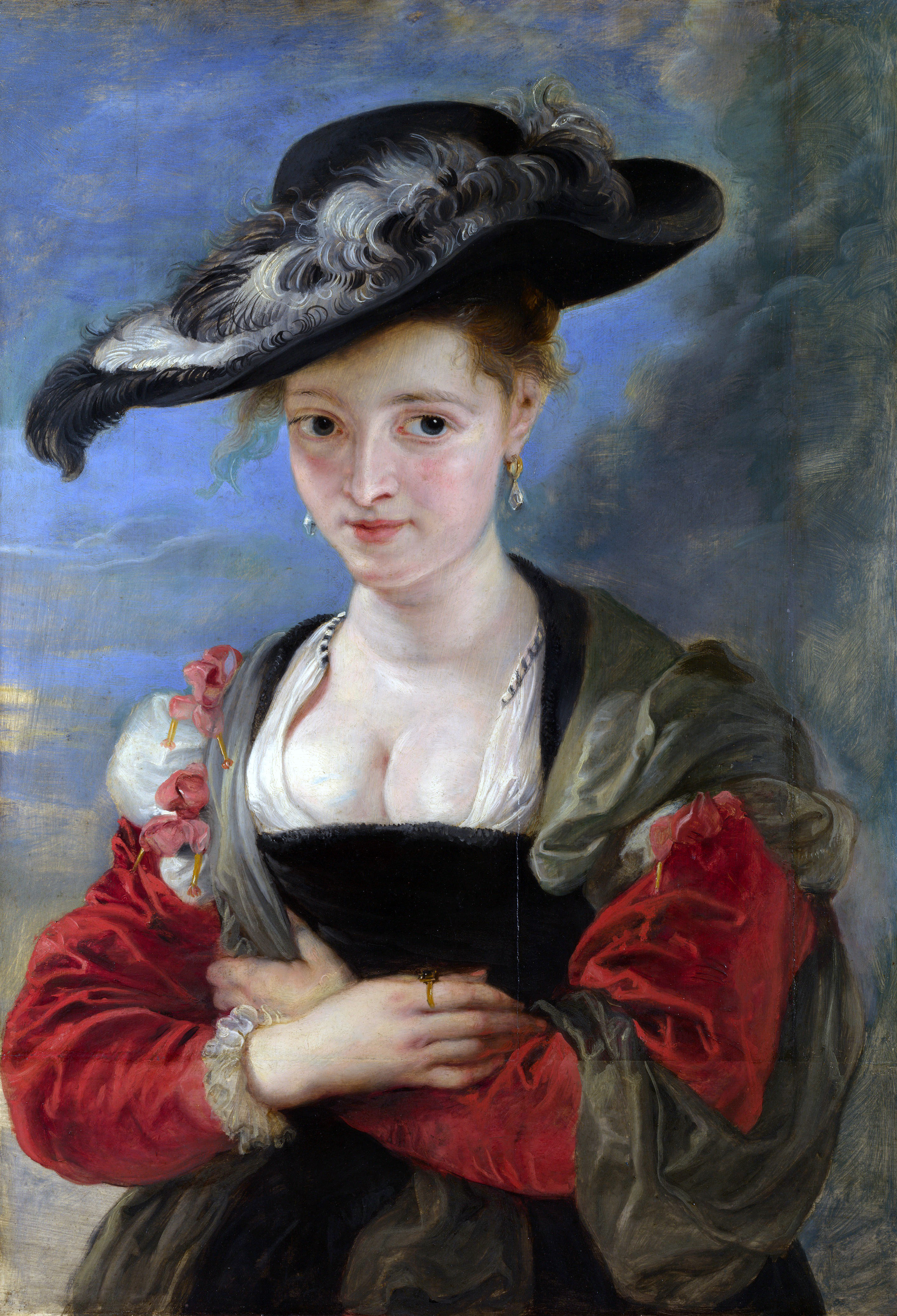
Rubens: Portrait of Susanna Lunden (aka.Susanna Fourment with Straw Hat), 1622–1625
Note: She is wearing a felt hat, not a straw hat.

== Literature and resources ==
- University of Pennsylvania, Memoirs of Madame Élisabeth Vigée Le Brun, Translated by Lionel Strachey, Copyright 1903, by Doubleday, Page & Company, Published, October, 1903
- Stephen Farthing: 1001 Must-See Paintings. Librero, 2012, p. 326. ISBN 978-90-8998-209-4
- Langmuir, Erika. The National Gallery: museum guide . Snoeck, Ducaju and son, Ghent, 1995, pp. 328–329. ISBN 978-90-5349-201-7
