= Portrait of Susanna Lunden =

Painting by Peter Paul Rubens

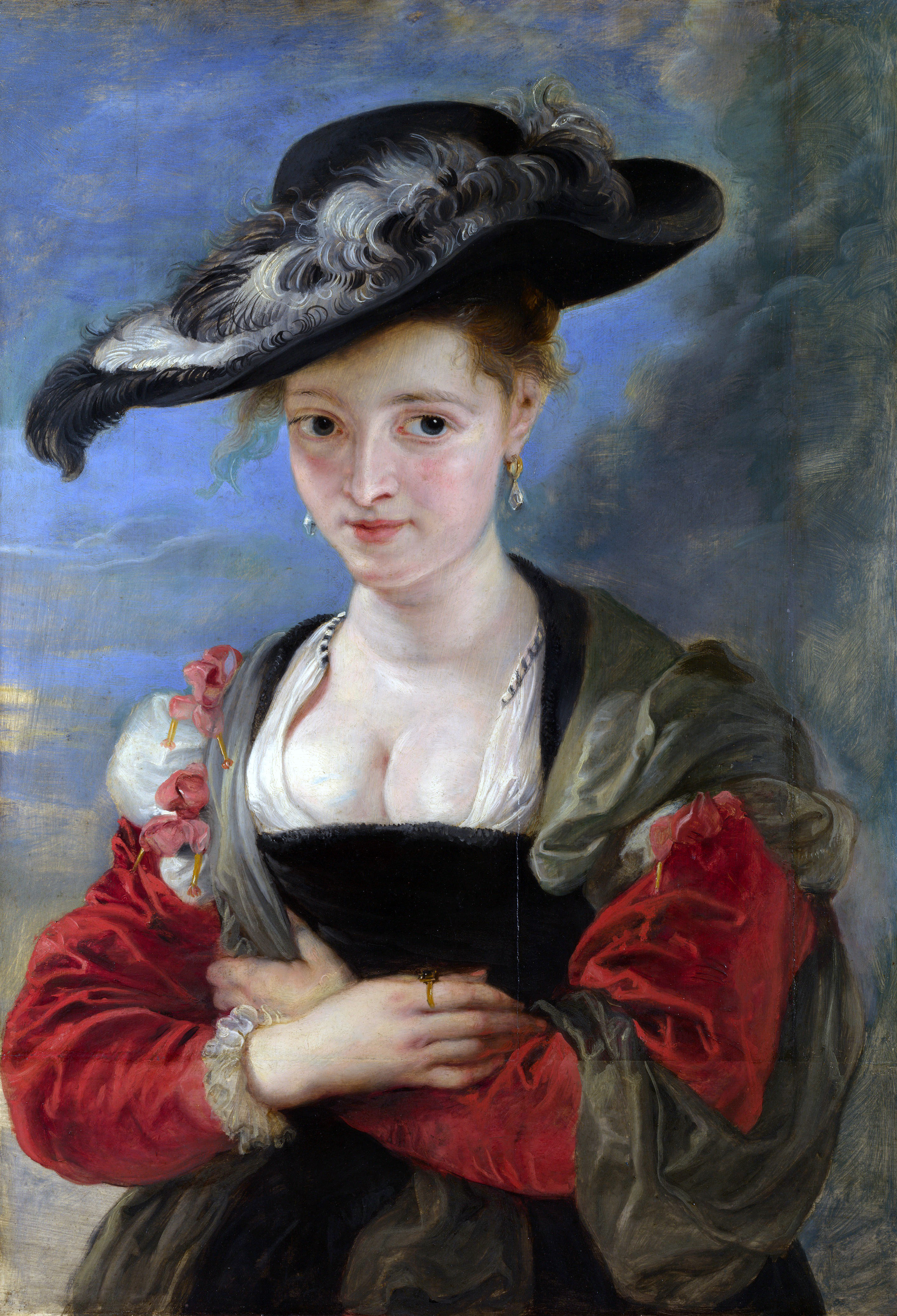
Peter Paul Rubens, Portrait of Susanna Lunden(?), called Le Chapeau de Paille

Portrait of Susanna Lunden or Het Strooien Hoedje (The Straw Hat) is a painting by Peter Paul Rubens, in the National Gallery, London. It was probably painted around 1622–1625.

The portrait's subject has not been securely identified, but she may be Susanna Lunden, née Fourment (1599–1628), the older sister of Rubens' future second wife Helena Fourment. If the identification is correct, the portrait probably dates to the time of Susanna's marriage to her second husband, Arnold Lunden, in 1622. The ring on her finger might mean that the painting is a marriage portrait. In the 19th century it was in the family collection of British former Prime Minister Sir Robert Peel at Drayton Manor, Staffordshire, until 1871 when it was sold to the National Gallery.

Rubens' portrait was engraved in 1823 by Robert Cooper (active 1795–1836). At that time, it acquired the name 'Het strooien hoedje' (Le Chapeau de Paille), which incorrectly describes the hat as "straw" (paille). A sketch of Rubens' painting (ca. 1823–24) by J. M. W. Turner is in the Tate.

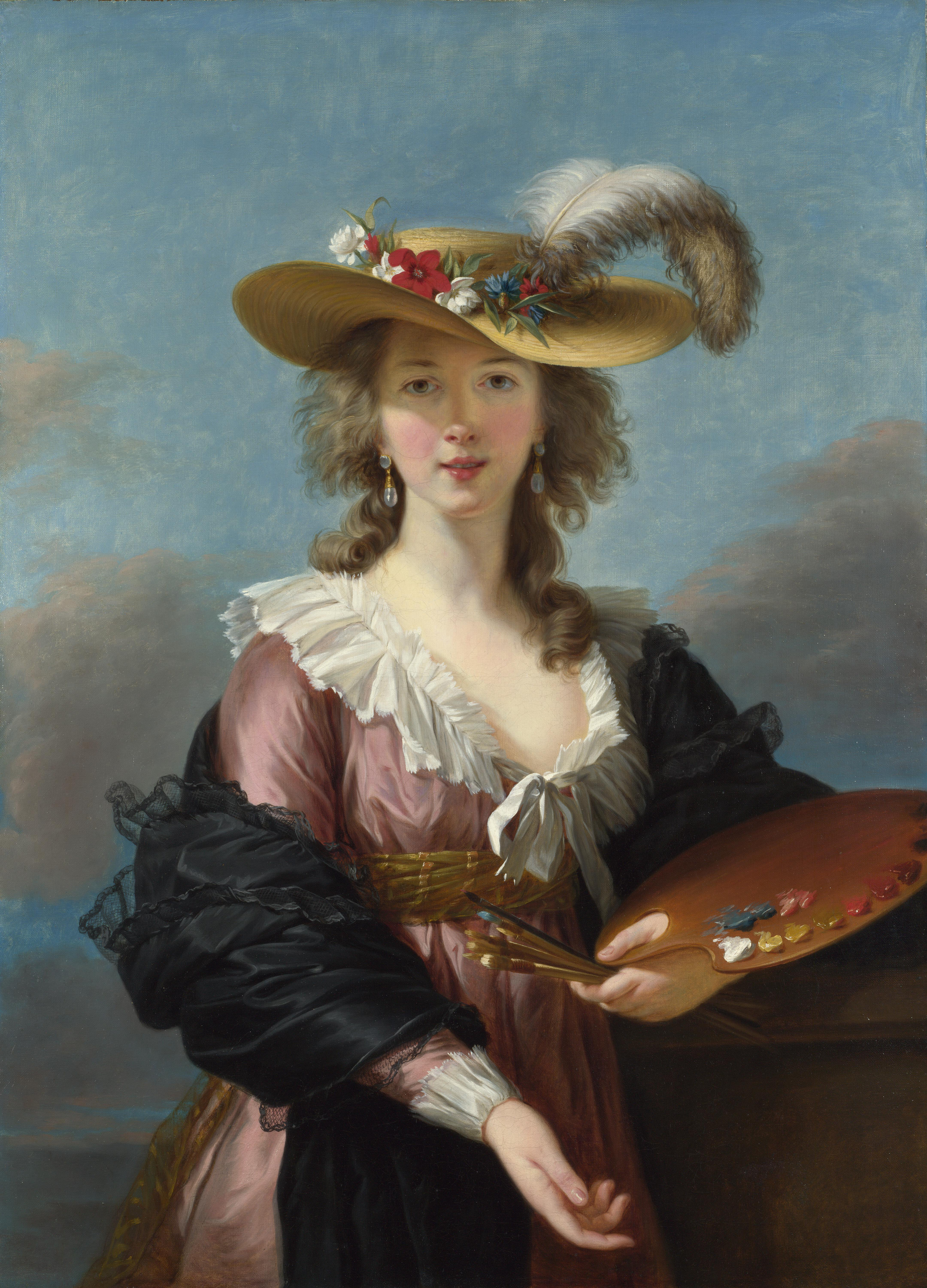
Élisabeth Vigée Le Brun, Self-portrait in a Straw Hat, 1782

In 1781, Élisabeth Vigée Le Brun and her husband visited Flanders and the Netherlands, which inspired her to paint Self-portrait in a Straw Hat (1782), a "free imitation" of Rubens's Het strooien hoedje (Le Chapeau de Paille).
