= Jean-Baptiste de Brouchoven =

Jean-Baptiste de Brouchoven (1619 – 13 November 1681) was a holder of high office and a diplomat in the Spanish Netherlands.

== Family ==
Jean-Baptiste was born in 's-Hertogenbosch in 1619, the son of Gerard de Brouchoven and Catharina Maes.

He married Rubens's widow, Helena Fourment, in 1643 or 1644, was widowed in 1673, and in 1674 married Marie Françoise d'Ennetières (died 1700).

With his first wife he had five children: Jean, Hyacinthe-Marie, Nicolas, Catherine, and Marie-Fernandine.

== Career ==
Brouchoven served as an alderman of Antwerp in 1643—44, and in 1648 as one of the two city treasurers. Thereafter he entered the service of the Crown.

In May 1655 he was appointed a member of the Council of Finance, and in 1660 he became a knight in the Order of Santiago. In 1663 he travelled to Madrid to take up an appointment as a councillor of the Supreme Council of Flanders. He successfully appealed to be allowed to retain concurrent membership of the Council of Finance. In 1665 he returned to the Spanish Netherlands as a Councillor of State. He was created baron of Bergeyck in 1666 and count in 1676.

In late 1667 he represented Philip IV of Spain in diplomatic negotiations with the Dutch Republic in The Hague. From late 1674 to early 1675, and again in 1677, he served as the king's acting ambassador to England.

In October 1677 he was reappointed to the Council of Flanders in Madrid.

He died in Toulouse on 13 November 1681, on his way back to the Low Countries.
