= Jean de Brouchoven, 2nd Count of Bergeyck =

Jean II de Brouchoven 2nd Count of Bergeyck
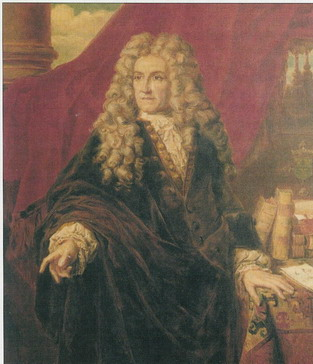
- Minister of War
- Born: October 9, 1644
- Died: May 21, 1725 (aged 80)
- Burial place: Leefdaal, Bertem, Belgium
- Spouse: Livina Marie de Beer-Meulebeke
- Children: 1
- Relatives: Jean-Baptiste de Brouchoven (father); Helena Fourment (mother)
- Military career
- Allegiance: Spain; Holy Roman Empire

Jean II de Brouchoven, 2nd Count of Bergeyck (October 9, 1644 – May 21, 1725), was a Brabantine politician who later was recognised as Baron of Leefdael.

== Life ==
He was the son of Jean-Baptiste de Brouchoven, 1st Count of Bergeyck, and Helena Fourment, Countess of Bergeyck. His younger brother Hyacinthe-Marie de Brouchoven was president of the Great Council. Jean married Livina Marie de Beer-Meulebeke, and became the father of Nicholas de Brouchoven, 3rd Count of Bergeyck.

=== Career ===
He was in service of the Spanish Crown as Superintendent of Finances and Minister of War. He was a member of the Royal Council and of the Supreme Council of Flanders in Madrid, and special envoy of Philip V of Spain to the Congress of Utrecht, but without participating in the final negotiations.

After his death he was buried in Leefdaal.
