= Hyacinthe-Marie de Brouchoven =

Hyachinthe-Marie de Brouchoven (1650–1707), Lord of Steen and Spy, was a nobleman from the Spanish Netherlands who became president of the Great Council of Mechelen, the highest law court in the Spanish Netherlands..

== Life ==
Brouchoven was born in Brussels on 16 April 1650, the son of Jean-Baptiste de Brouchoven, Count of Bergeyck, and his wife Hélène Fourment. His elder brother, Jean de Brouchoven, became the second count of Bergeyck. Hyacinthe Marie inherited the Lordship of Spy.

Brouchoven studied law at Leuven University. Initially intended for the Church, in 1673 he became a canon of Ghent Cathedral. In 1678, after resigning his canonry, he was appointed to the Council of Namur, and on 7 June 1680 became a councillor on the Great Council of Mechelen. In April 1690, the king appointed him to the Supreme Council of Flanders in Madrid. On 16 January 1697 he was appointed to the Brussels Council of State. After the Peace of Ryswick (1697), Brouchoven was one of two commissioners from the Spanish Netherlands sent to Lille to fix the new border with the Kingdom of France. On 7 May 1699 he became President of the Great Council.

Brouchoven died in Mechelen on 7 October 1707.

== Descendants ==
Brouchoven married Marie-Adrienne Zuallart, by whom he had two children. The branch of Brouchoven-Spy became extinct when his son died without heirs.

Hyachinthe-Marie de Brouchoven, Lord of Spy
married to Marie-Adrienne de Zuallart

  1. Guillaume-François de Brouchoven, Lord of Spy: no heirs.
  2. Marie-Jeanne de Brouchoven-Spy, died 1708;
    married to Charles-Antoine de Zevecote, Lord of Soetschore.
    1. Marie-Caroline de Zevecote, Lady of Soetschore, born in 1701 x Pierre-Albert Colins, Lord of Ter-Meeren.

Government offices
Preceded by Guillaume-Albert de Grysperre, Baron of Goyck	19th President of the Great Council; 1699-1707	Succeeded by Jacques Stalins, Lord of Poppenrode
