= Girl in a Fur =

1536-38 painting by Titian

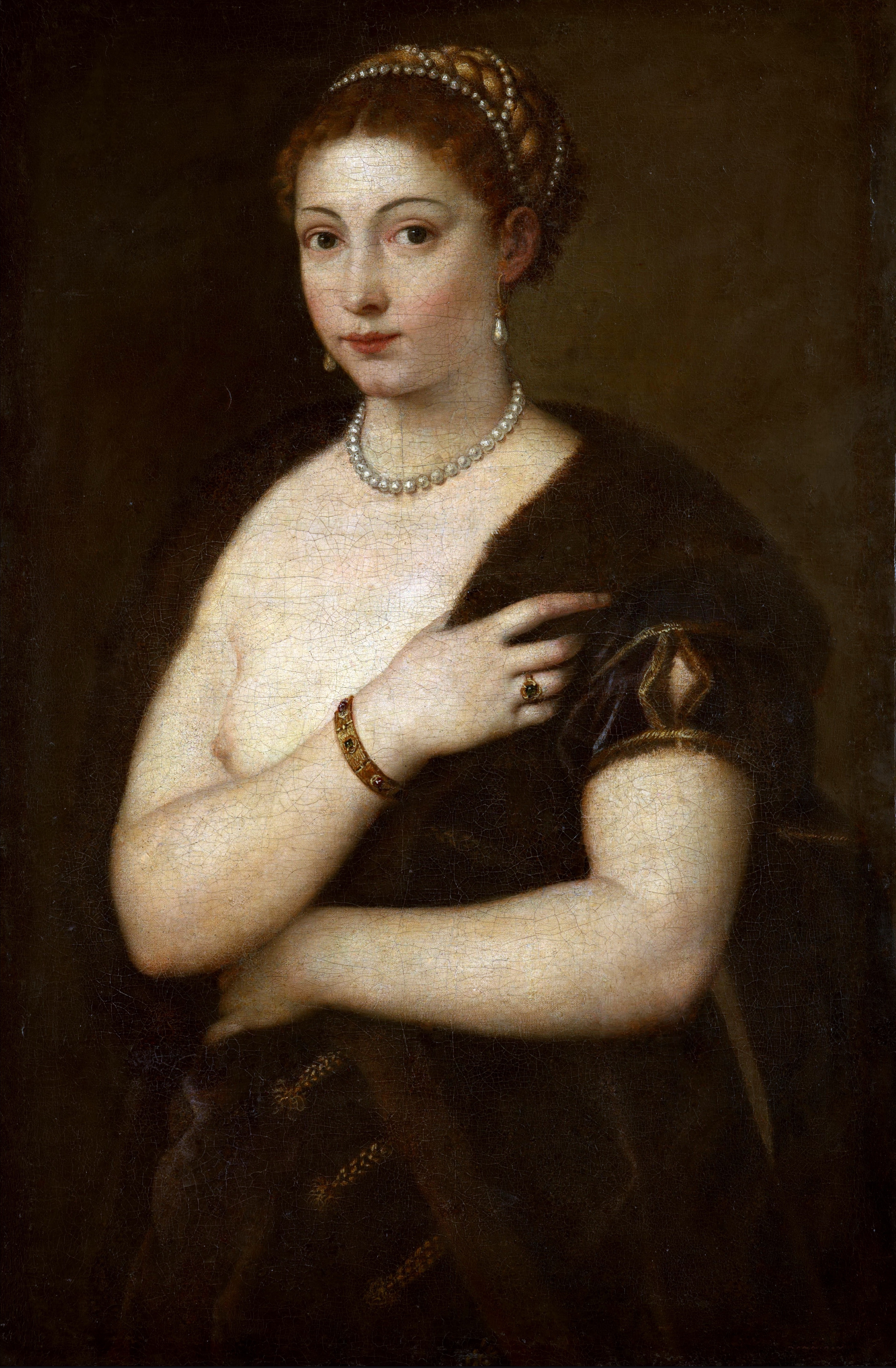
- Artist: Titian
- Year: 1536-1538
- Medium: oil on canvas
- Dimensions: 95.5 cm × 63.7 cm (37.6 in × 25.1 in)
- Location: Kunsthistorisches Museum; Vienna

Girl in a Fur is an oil on canvas painting by Titian, from 1536-1538. It is held in the Kunsthistorisches Museum, in Vienna. It depicts the same female model that he used in La Bella and Venus of Urbino.

== History and description ==
It was probably commissioned by Francesco Maria I della Rovere, Duke of Urbino, nephew of Pope Julius II, or by his son Guidobaldo. A copy by the Baroque master Peter Paul Rubens is held at the Queensland Art Gallery, in Brisbane.

Titian depicts a half-naked beautiful woman with a black fur draped over her body. She wears a pearl necklace, teardrop earrings, and gold bracelets and rings. The fur slides down her right shoulder, revealing a plump, round, pale skin that frames her figure. Her skin has a slight blush, and highlights in her eyes give her a lively look. Her hair is braided on top of her head and adorned with a pearl ornament. The woman's pose, holding the fur in her right hand, is based on the classical sculpture Venus Pudica. Rather than a portrait of a seductive and sensual woman, the painting is a celebration of an ideal of female beauty inspired by the lyricism of the time based on Petrarch.

The woman in question is believed to be the same as depicted in the Venus of Urbino, La Bella, and Portrait of a young woman with a feather hat. There is a close relationship with the latter two works, and scientific examination using X-rays has revealed that the painting was originally intended as a copy of La Bella, both in pose and costume, but was later altered to resemble the present-day nude.

== See also ==
- List of works by Titian

== Bibliography ==
- Ferraro, Joanne M. (2001) Marriage Wars in Late Renaissance Venice. Studies in the History of Sexuality, 99-0528821-X. Oxford: Oxford University Press. Libris 4615160. ISBN 0-19-514495-3
- Goffen, Rona (1997) Titian's Women. New Haven, Connecticut: Yale University Press. Libris 4770583. ISBN 0-300-06846-8
- Loos, Viggo (1948). Tizian. Stockholm: Wahlström & Widstrand
- Zuffi, Stefano (1999). Titian. London: Dorling Kindersly. ISBN 0-7894-4141-1
