= Isabella in Red (Rubens) =

Painting by Peter Paul Rubens

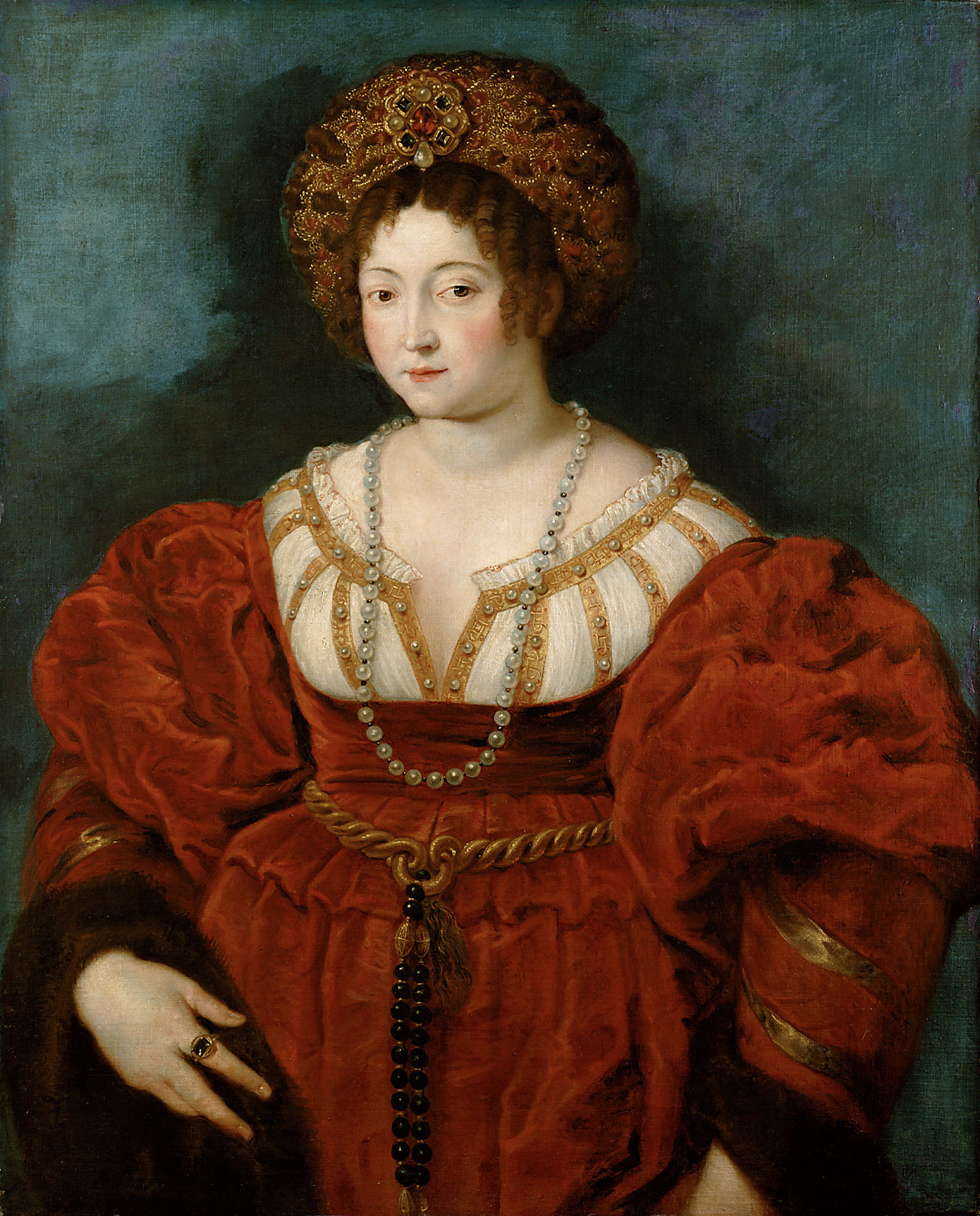
- Artist: Rubens (copy after Titian)
- Year: c. 1605
- Type: Oil on Canvas
- Subject: Isabella d'Este
- Dimensions: 102 cm × 81 cm (40 in × 32 in)
- Location: Kunsthistorisches Museum, Vienna
- Accession: GG 1534

Isabella in Red (also called Portrait of the Aged Isabella d'Este) is a portrait of a woman by Peter Paul Rubens in the Kunsthistorisches Museum in Vienna. It is considered a close copy of a lost Titian original.

== Description ==
The knee-piece shows a somewhat chubby middle-aged woman in a red velvet dress in front of a turquoise background. On her head she wears a balzo, a fashionable invention of Isabella d'Este (from 1509), which was widely used in northern Italy in the 1530s. Personal features are reddish-brown curls, brown eyes and classically arched eyebrows.

== History ==
At the beginning of the 17th century, Rubens was a court painter in Mantua. During this time (and later in other places) he copied Italian painters, including Titian. These are considered close copies. The date of the Rubens copy remains unclear (1600, c. 1605 or later), and so does the date of Titian's original (depending on the source, the years 1524-1536 are assumed). After Rubens' death, two copies from his hand of two Titian portraits depicting Isabella d'Este are mentioned in his inventory. The Rubens painting Isabella in Red later transferred from the collection of Archduke Leopold Wilhelm of Austria to the Kunsthistorisches Museum.

Independently, since chronologically before, other copies of the lost Titian original exist, in particular:

- A copy from Titian's workshop (very similar but with a more youthful representation of the subject) is documented by a photograph (provenances Léopold Goldschmidt and Contesse Vogué in Paris)
- An anonymous 16th-century copy (breastpiece representing the same age) shows the inscription "Isabella Estensis" and is now in the Walker Art Gallery in Liverpool.

== Identity of the sitter ==
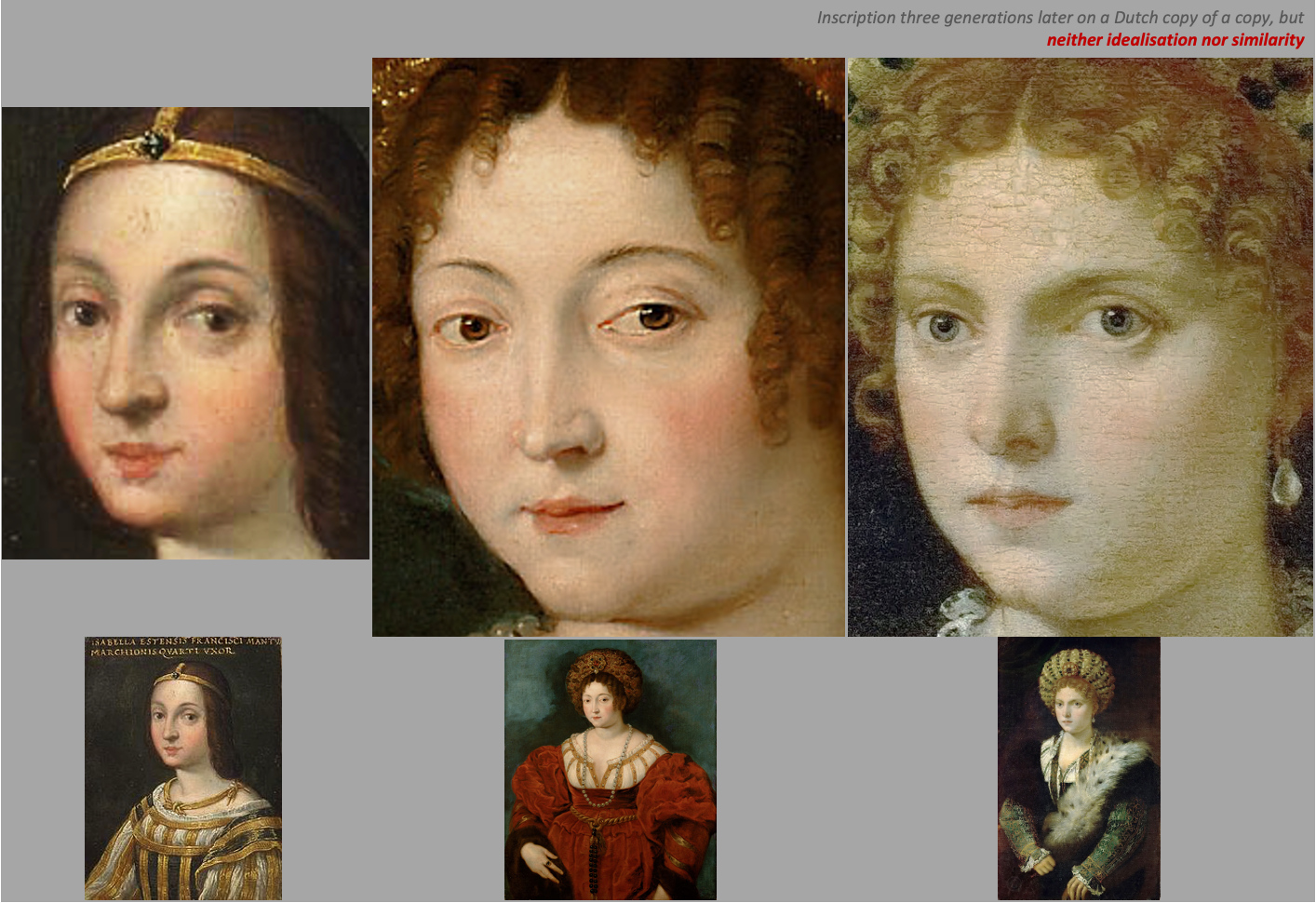
The three portraits in colour in the Kunsthistorisches Museum Vienna - maybe including a misidentification?

As identifications of Isabella d'Este (1474-1539), three coloured portraits are exhibited in the Kunsthistorisches Museum. The personal characteristics are contradictory (see graphic on the right):

- Ambras Miniature (anonymous Mantuan artist in the 16th century),
- Isabella in Red (copy by Rubens c. 1605 after a lost original by Titian) and
- Isabella in Black (Titian 1530s).

Due to the resulting confusion, all other museums have withdrawn colour identifications. The differences cannot be explained by idealisation, as Isabella in Black was commissioned as a "face-lift" of the over-60s and would be unflattering (e.g. eye colour, stub nose and eyebrows).

Potential explanation would be a misidentification either in Isabella in Black or coincident confusions in Isabella in Red and the Ambras Miniature. The contradictions start in the inventory after Ruben's death in Antwerp with the simultaneous naming of Isabella in Red and Isabella in Black. The inventory is four generations later, in 1640, and thus included namings are not reliable. Portrayals with Balzo were often referred to as the famous patron of the arts after Isabella d'Este's death.

The two older copies of the lost Titian original (including an inscription "Isabella Estensis" independent of Rubens) speak for the correct identification in the model of Isabella in Red. The Ambras Miniature also shows homogeneous features with Isabella in Red, bears also an inscription Isabella Estensis and, as a Mantuan copy about a generation later, should still represent a relatively contemporary identification. The confusion would then have to be (as published by some experts) in Isabella in Black.

== See also ==
- Isabella d'Este (section Portraits)
- Isabella in Black

== Literature ==
- Francesco Valcanover: L‘ opera completa di Tiziano. Rizzoli, Milan 1969, p. 108 as work no. 173 (Italian).
- Sylvia Ferino-Pagden: La Prima Donna del Mondo - Isabella d'Este. Exhibition catalogue Kunsthistorisches Museum Vienna. Vienna 1994, pp. 114–117 (German).
- Jeremy Wood: Rubens Copies and Derivations from Renaissance Masters, Italian Artists, Titian and North Italian Artists, vol. 1, Harvey Miller Publishers, London 2009, pp. 248–249.
