= Isabella d'Este =

Italian noblewoman, patron of the arts and fashion leader (1474–1539)

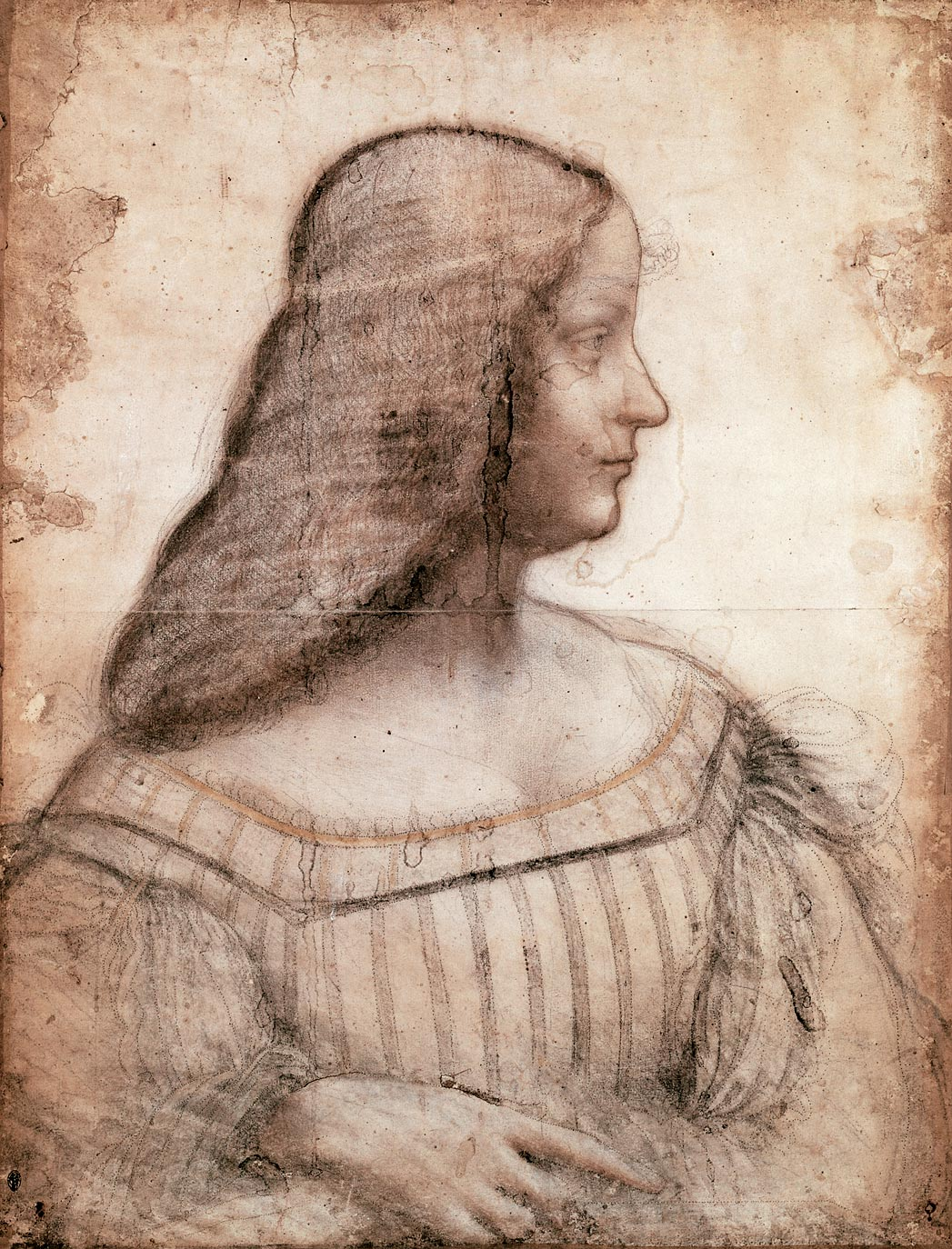
- Portrait of Isabella d'Este by Leonardo da Vinci (c. 1499–1500)

Marchioness consort of Mantua
- Reign: 12 February 1492 - 29 March 1519
- Born: 19 May 1474; Ferrara, Duchy of Ferrara
- Died: 13 February 1539 (aged 64); Mantua, Duchy of Mantua
- Spouse: Francesco II Gonzaga, Marquis of Mantua (m. 1492; died 1519)
- Issue: Eleonora Gonzaga, Duchess of Urbino; Margherita Gonzaga; Federico II Gonzaga, Duke of Mantua; Livia Gonzaga; Ippolita Gonzaga; Ercole Gonzaga; Ferrante Gonzaga; Livia Gonzaga
- House: Este
- Father: Ercole I d'Este
- Mother: Eleanor of Naples

Isabella d'Este (19 May 1474 – 13 February 1539) was the Marchioness of Mantua and one of the leading women of the Italian Renaissance as a major cultural and political figure.

She was a patron of the arts as well as a leader of fashion, and her innovative style of dressing was emulated by many women. The poet Ariosto labeled her the "liberal and magnanimous Isabella", while author Matteo Bandello described her as "supreme among women". Diplomat Niccolò da Correggio went even further by hailing her as "The First Lady of the world".

She served as the regent of Mantua during the absence of her husband Francesco II Gonzaga, Marquis of Mantua and during the minority of her son Federico. She was a prolific letter-writer and maintained a lifelong correspondence with her sister-in-law Elisabetta Gonzaga. Isabella grew up in a cultured family in the city-state of Ferrara. She received a fine classical education and she met many famous humanist scholars and artists. Due to the vast amount of extant correspondence between Isabella and her family and friends, her life is extremely well documented.

== Biography ==
Isabella was born on Tuesday, 19 May 1474 at nine o'clock in the evening. Isabella's mother, Eleanor of Naples, wrote a letter to her friend Barbara Gonzaga describing the details of Isabella's birth in Ferrara. Eleanor was the daughter of Ferdinand I, the Aragonese King of Naples, and Isabella of Clermont.

One year later, on 29 June 1475, her sister Beatrice was born, and in 1476 and 1477 two brothers, Alfonso and Ferrante, were born. In 1479 and 1480 two more brothers were born: Ippolito and Sigismondo. Of all the children born into the family, Isabella is believed to have been the favourite.

In the year of her brother Ferrante's birth, Isabella was among the children of the family who travelled to Naples with her mother. When her mother returned to Ferrara, Isabella accompanied her, while the other two children remained in Naples for many years: Beatrice was adopted by her grandfather, and her little brother Ferrante was left under the tutelage of their uncle Alfonso.

=== Education ===
Due to her outstanding intellect, she often discussed the classics and the affairs of state with ambassadors. Isabella d'Este encouraged her humanist apologists, including Mario Equicola, to promote the view that female education and experience of the world could cultivate the prudence and strength of character necessary for political authority. In addition, she was personally acquainted with the painters, musicians, writers, and scholars who lived in and around the court. Besides her extensive knowledge of history and languages, she could also recite Virgil, Cicero and Terence by heart. In addition, she also had the ability to recite Latin and Greek grammar. After leaving Ferrara for Mantua, another former tutor, Jacopo Gallino, reminisced about teaching her, and sent her books they previously used together. While in Mantua, it appears she let go of studying Greek, but continued to study Latin. Isabella was also a talented singer and musician, and was taught to play the lute by Giovanni Angelo Testagrossa. In addition to these accomplishments, she was also an innovator of new dances, having been instructed in the art of dance by Ambrogio, a Jewish dancing master. Through her well-imbued lessons of a scholarly, classical, and artistic nature, Isabella later went on to apply these talents to her co-rule with her husband Francesco. By using these, she worked to solidify the way in which her presence and authority was seen, thus creating an image for herself and the Houses her family represented.

=== Betrothal and marriage ===
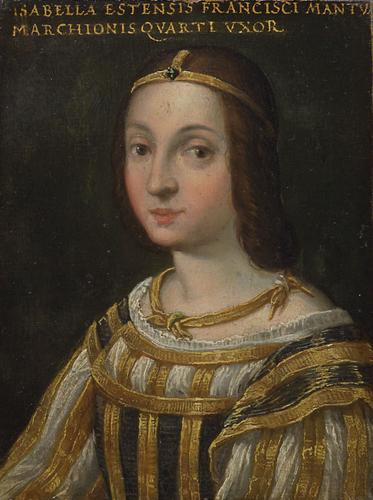
Ambras Miniature of Isabella, anonymous artist (16th century)

In 1480, at the age of six, Isabella was betrothed to the eight years older Francesco, the heir to the Marquess of Mantua. The Duke of Milan requested her hand in marriage for his son, Ludovico, two weeks later. Instead, her sister, Beatrice, was betrothed to Ludovico and became the Duchess of Milan. Her dowry amounted to 25,000 ducats. Although he was not handsome, Isabella admired Francesco for his strength and bravery; she also regarded him as a gentleman. After their first few encounters, she began to enjoy his company and she spent the next few years getting to know him and preparing to be the Marchioness of Mantua. During their courtship, Isabella treasured the letters, poems, and sonnets he sent her as gifts.

Ten years later, on 11 February 1490, at age 15, she married Francesco by proxy. By then, he had succeeded to the marquisate. Besides being the Marquess, Francesco was captain general of the armies of the Republic of Venice. Isabella became his wife amid a spectacular outpouring of public rejoicing and a grand celebration that took place on 15 February. She brought the sum of 3,000 ducats as her marriage portion, as well as valuable jewelry, dishes, and a silver service. Prior to the magnificent banquet which followed the wedding ceremony, Isabella rode through the main streets of Ferrara astride a horse draped in gems and gold. In addition, the couple were consistent in their correspondence, writing "la lettera missiva" to each other in order to further their familiarity following their union. Such letters ultimately detail the changes and developments of their relationship, each one composed and abiding by period-specific court conventions. Over the course of their marriage, there were a sizeable amount of letters sent between the couple. Their letters contained information about "political and administrative matters" but they also discussed the affection that they shared for one another in the letters from the beginning of their marriage.

==== Relations with Milan ====
In 1491, Isabella went with a small entourage to Brescello and from there to Pavia, to accompany her sister Beatrice, who was married to Ludovico il Moro. On this occasion, she saw Galeazzo Sanseverino again — as she had known him as a child in Ferrara — with whom she began a large, and at times humorous, exchange of letters. However, his identity is not certain and could be the almost homonymous Galeazzo Visconti, Count of Busto Arsizio, a courtier also dear to the dukes.

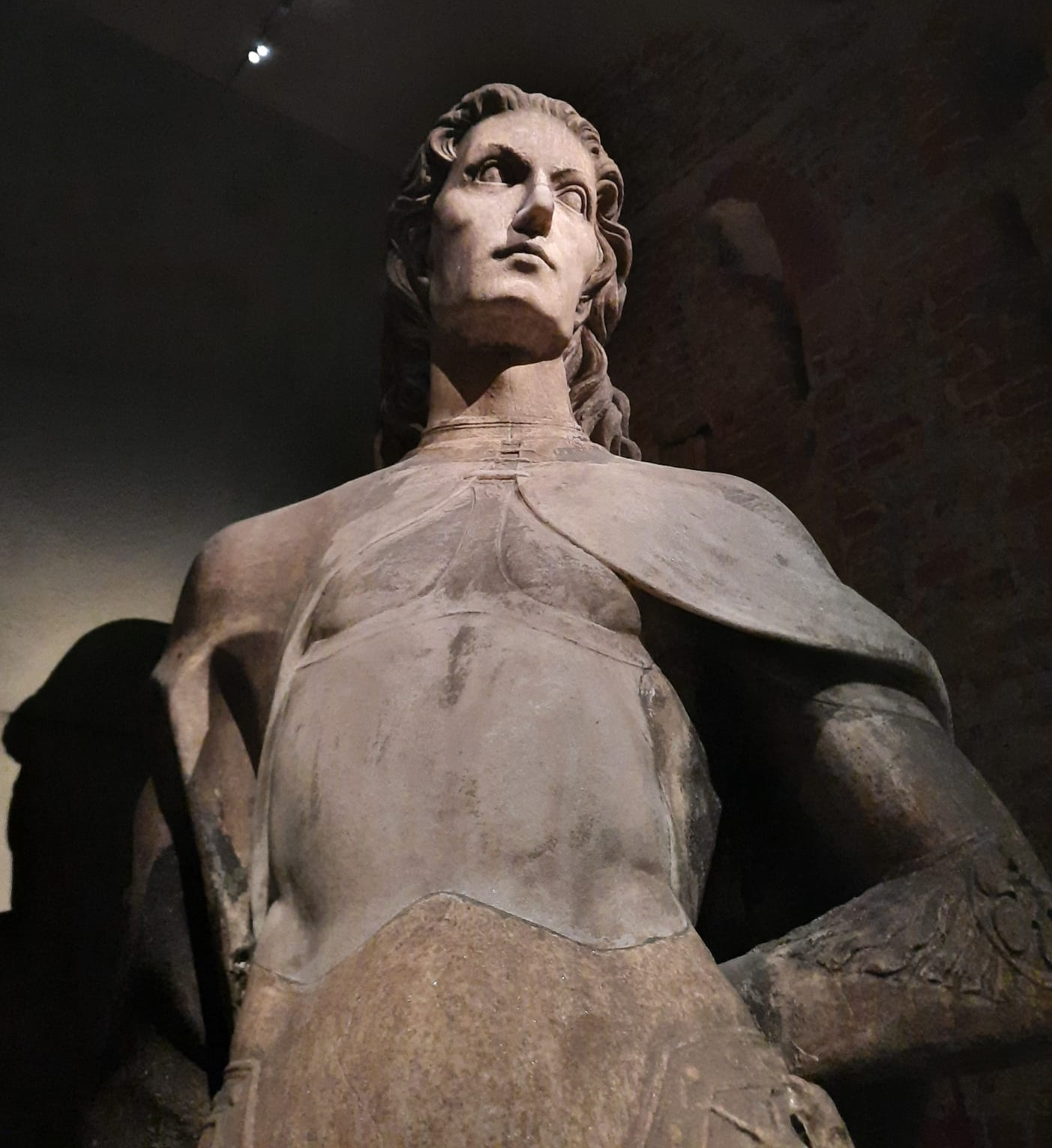
Probable portrait of Galeazzo Sanseverino, statue in the collection of the Great Museum of Milan Cathedral

Between the two immediately ignited a dispute, destined to last for months, on who was the best paladin, Orlando or Rinaldo: Galeazzo supported the first, the sisters d'Este the second. Galeazzo, who exercised a strong fascination, soon managed to convert them both to Orlando's faith, but Isabella, once back in Mantua, returned to prefer Rinaldo, so that Galeazzo remembered her as "I alone was enough to make her change her mind and cry out Rolando! Rolando!", invited her to follow her sister's example and swore that he would convert her a second time, as soon as they met again. Isabella jokingly replied that she would then bring a frog to offend him, and the dispute went on for a long time.

On 11 February, speaking to her about the amusements he had with Beatrice, he wrote to her: "I will also strive to improve in order to give greater pleasure to the S. V., when I come for her this summer", and lamented the lack of "his sweet company". Isabella's presence was in fact much desired in Milan, not only by Galeazzo but also by her sister, Ludovico and the other courtiers. However the Marquise was able to go there a few times, as her husband Francesco was wary of sending it to her, judging that in that court too many "madness" were committed, and perhaps also out of jealousy of Ludovico.

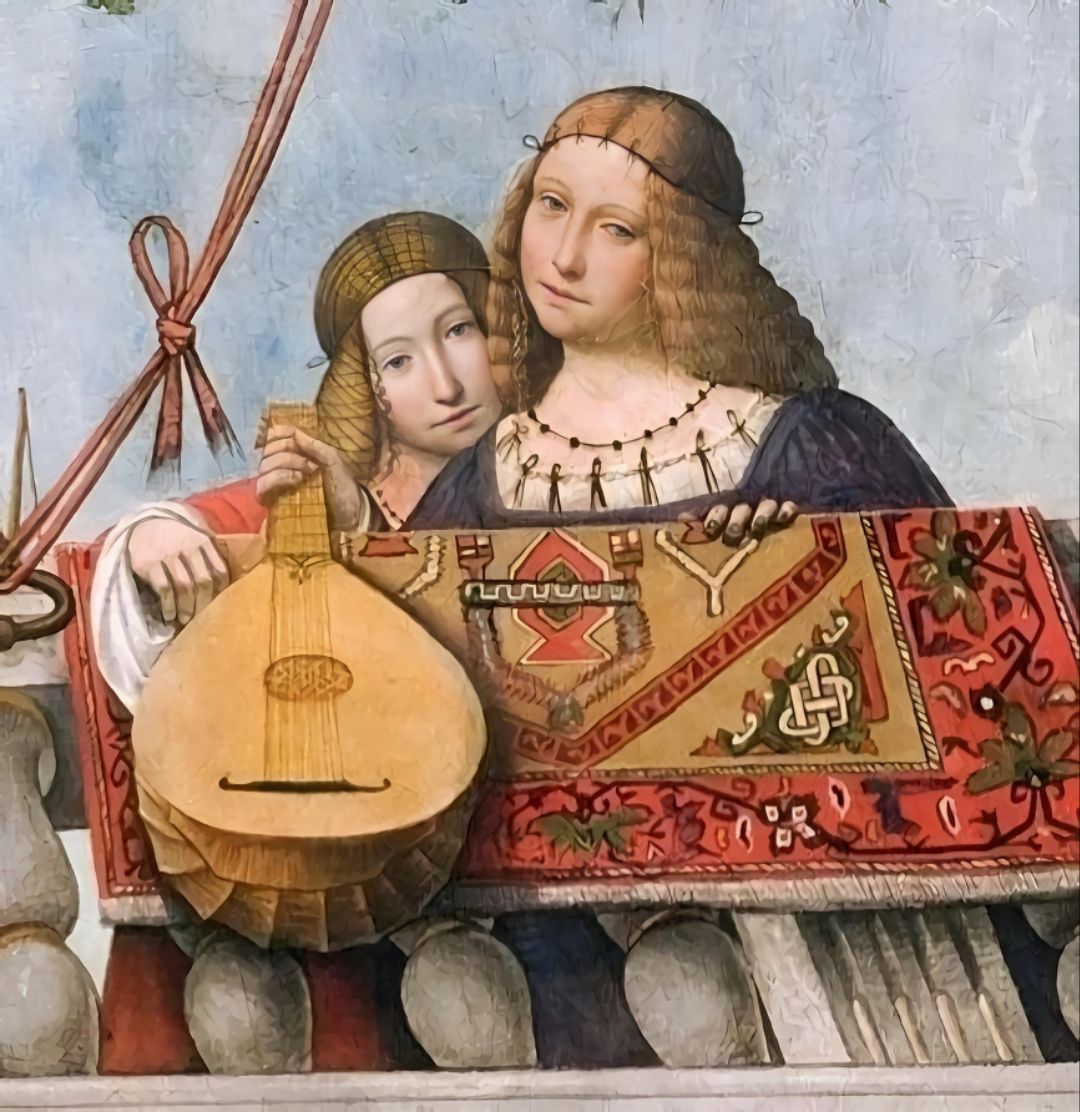
Alleged portrait of the two sisters: Beatrice (left) and Isabella (right), in the ceiling fresco of the Sala del Tesoro of Palazzo Costabili near Ferrara. Attributed Benvenuto Tisi da Garofalo, dated 1503–1506.

Despite the affection, Isabella began to feel envy for her sister Beatrice, first for the very fortunate marriage that had touched her and for the enormous riches, then for the two sons in perfect health who were born to her a short time later, while she seemed unable to have children, and in this aroused the concerns of her mother Eleonora, who continually exhorted her in letters to be as close as possible to her husband. A certain hatred can also be seen in a letter to his mother dating back to his visit to Pavia in August 1492, when, speaking of Beatrice, he wrote: "she is not a greater than me, but she is much bigger!"; in a similar way she also expressed herself to her husband, not being able yet to know, perhaps, that the sister's coarseness was due to the incipient pregnancy (she was at the fourth-fifth month). These frictions were perhaps also linked to the fact that Ludovico had initially asked for Isabella's hand, in 1480, and that this had not been possible because, only a few days earlier, Duke Ercole had officially promised it to Francesco Gonzaga.

Despite everything, in 1492, she was very close to Beatrice in a difficult moment of her pregnancy, that is when she was suddenly struck by an attack of malarial fevers, and in 1495, she went again to Milan to assist her sister in her second birth and also baptized her nephew Francesco.

In the summer of 1494, on the occasion of the descent of the French into Italy, Beatrice invited her sister to Milan to kiss Gilbert of Montpensier and others of the royal house, according to the custom French. Secretary Benedetto Capilupi reported:

The Duchess says that when the Duke of Orliens came, she had to dress colorfully, dance and be kissed by the Duke, who wanted to kiss all the bridesmaids and women of account. [...] Coming Count Delfino or someone else of royal blood, the Duchess invites the S.V. to take these little kisses

— Benedetto Capilupi's letter to Isabella d'Este

In fact, it does not seem that Beatrice had any conflicting feelings towards Isabella, nor that she saw with a bad eye the complicity between the latter and her husband Ludovico. The Moro in fact, who was of generous nature, often gave Isabella even very expensive gifts: once he sent her fifteen arms of a fabric so precious as to cost forty ducats on her arm – an amazing sum – saying that he had already made a dress for Beatrice.

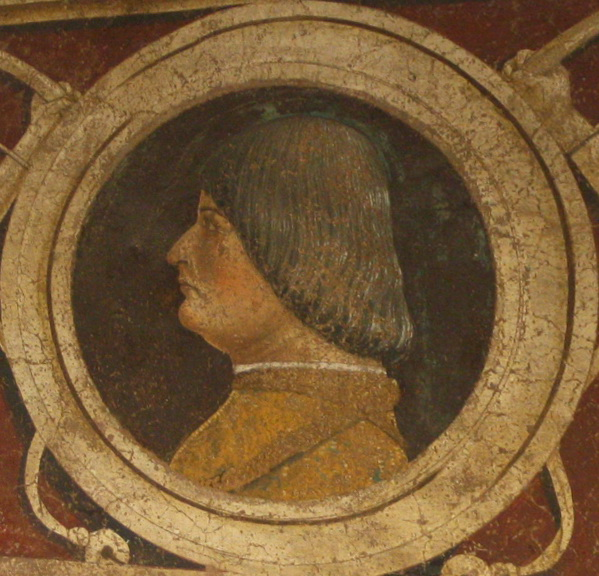
Ludovico il Moro, Isabella's brother-in-law. Round from the Renaissance frieze torn from the Visconti castle of Invorio Inferiore

After the death of his wife, which took place in 1497, Ludovico came to allude to a secret relationship with Isabella, claiming that it was out of jealousy of his wife that the Marquis Francesco played a double game between him and the Lordship of Venice. The rumor was however promptly denied by his father Ercole.

Others instead defined Beatrice's attitude towards her sister as "complexed second child" because in the letter of congratulations to Isabella for the birth of little Eleonora - who, being female, incredibly disappointed her mother - she added the greetings of her little son Hercules to "soa cusina", despite not having the child yet turned one year of age, something that historians such as Luciano Chiappini interpreted as a sort of mockery, of "refined malice", "a slap given with grace and grace". In fact, if Isabella was always the daughter most loved by her parents, Beatrice had been ceded to her grandfather, and only with the birth of the firstborn had she obtained her own revenge.

Other mischief between sisters dates back to the weeks immediately following the battle of Fornovo: Beatrice, who was at the siege of Novara together with the Marquis Francesco, wanted to see the booty stolen from the tent of King Charles VIII during the battle, booty that however Francesco had already sent to his wife in Mantua. He wrote to his wife to give it to his sister-in-law, but Isabella replied that she was not so willing to cede this honor to her sister and, with the excuse that she lacked a mule, begged her husband to invent some expedient. Beatrice replied that it was not her intention to steal the booty from her sister, but that she only wanted to see it all together and then return it to her. Meanwhile, it occurred to her to procure "a femina de partito", that is, a high-ranking prostitute, to Francis, saying to do it "for a good cause and to avoid greater evil", that is to say to preserve her brother-in-law and sister from the terrible malfrancese, but perhaps also to ingratiate herself with him. In October, Francis wrote to his wife sorry that she was not there with them to see the army before it was disbanded, but it does not seem that he had urged her to come, probably because he had at heart his safety (the camps were dangerous places, where violent fights often broke out, and Beatrice herself had been saved on one occasion by Francis, when she risked being raped by a few thousand Alemannic mercenaries).

Moreover, Isabella had already had a mishap with some Genoese soldiers who, upon entering the city in 1492, surrounded her to appropriate her mount and harness, according to custom. So she later told her husband: "I was never more afraid; and they tore all the harness to pieces, and took off the bridle before I could dismount, despite the fact that the governor interposed him and that I voluntarily offered it to him. I lost heart, although among so many partisans I was afraid of some misfortune. Finally, helped, I freed myself from their hands ".

Having also received different educations, the two sisters were the opposite of each other: Isabella, more like her mother, was sweet, graceful and a lover of tranquility; Beatrice, more like her father, was impetuous, adventurous and aggressive. Beatrice loved to shoot crossbow, Isabella had "the hand so light that we cannot play well [the clavichord], when we have to strain it for the hardness of the keys". However, they were united by the desire to excel in everything.

In the last two hundred years, historians and writers were divided in preference for one or the other: many - such as Francesco Malaguzzi Valeri and Maria Bellonci - regretted that Ludovico had not, only briefly, married Isabella, fantasizing about the splendors that Isabella would be able to bring to Milan, in conditions of greater well-being than to Mantua, and how he could distract the Moro from his perverse policy. These judgments were not separated from a blatant contempt for the second daughter, as in the case of Alessandro Luzio, who writes: "The luck that made play of this Sforza, making him pass from the brightest heights to the darkest abysses of misery, had in April 1480 exchanged a beneficial star for a sinister meteor".

In truth, other historians, including Rodolfo Renier himself, Luzio's colleague, judged that Beatrice was the most suitable wife for Ludovico, since she knew, with her own audacity, to instill courage in her insecure consort, and acquired political depth already in her early youth, so much so as to be decisive in situations of greatest danger, while Isabella could boast a role in this sense only in the years of maturity. The different fate of the two sisters certainly weighed in these judgments: Isabella lived sixty-five years, Beatrice died at twenty-one. It was from this tragic loss, for which she proved inconsolable, that Isabella undertook to support her brother-in-law's cause with her husband Francesco, who was against him. So he continued to do until the fall of the Sforza, in 1499, when he suddenly changed sides and declared himself to be "good French".

In January 1495, Isabella, who was visiting Milan for the birth of her niece (the child of Beatrice d'Este), was received by Isabella d'Aragona who was the newly widowed Duchess of Milan. During their meeting, d'Aragona met with d'Este in a room full of black drapes along the walls while in mourning attire, hence the death of her husband, bringing attention to her status, authority, and power as the widow of the former Duke of Milan. The meeting happened during a time and period of tension within the Sforza family as Isabella's brother-in-law, Ludovico Sforza, claimed the title as duke following the death of his predecessor.

==== Marriage ====
As the couple had known and admired one another for many years, their mutual attraction deepened into love. Reportedly, marriage to Francesco caused Isabella to "bloom". At the time of her wedding, Isabella was said to have been pretty, slim, graceful, and well-dressed. Her long, fine hair was dyed a fashionable pale blonde and her eyes were described as "brown as fir cones in autumn, scattered laughter". According to Cockram, Isabella and Francesco shared political authority and cooperated in practice, rather than being simple rivals. As an example, Cockram describes how Isabella forged a letter in her absent husband's name to trick a Borgia spy, which she presents as evidence of the couple's teamwork.

Isabella and her husband frequently swapped traditional gender duties when politically advantageous, yet they still often maintained conventional gendered roles. Isabella actively cultivated a traditionally feminine image by maintaining a prominent female entourage, patronizing art that highlighted feminine virtue, and spearheading popular fashion and cosmetic styles.

Isabella's relationship with her husband over the years often proved to be tense, at times very tense, both for the political differences between the two and for the difficulty in procreating a male heir. In truth, Francesco for his part was always very proud of his daughters and never showed himself disappointed, indeed from the beginning he declared himself in love with the firstborn Eleonora, despite the absolute disappointment of Isabella who refused her daughter, who was then very lovingly educated by her sister-in-law Elisabetta, who because of her husband's impotence never had children. When in 1496 the second daughter Margherita was born, Isabella was so angry that she wrote to her husband, who was then fighting the French in Calabria, a letter in which she blamed him, declaring that she did nothing but reap the fruits of his sown. Francis replied that he was instead very happy with the birth of his daughter – who, however, he did not have time to know, having died in swaddling clothes – and indeed forbade anyone to show discontent with it.

Only in 1500 their son Federico was born.

In his capacity of captain general of the Venetian armies, Francesco often was required to go to Venice for conferences that left Isabella in Mantua on her own at La Reggia, the ancient palace that was the family seat of the Gonzagas. She did not lack company, however, as she passed the time with her mother and with her sister, Beatrice. Upon meeting Elisabetta Gonzaga, her 18-year-old sister-in-law, the two women became close friends. They enjoyed reading books, playing cards, and travelling about the countryside together. Once they journeyed as far as Lake Garda during one of Francesco's absences.

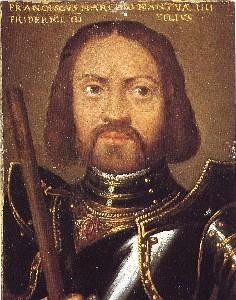
Isabella's husband, Francesco II Gonzaga, Marquis of Mantua

==== Diplomatic missions ====
Isabella had met the French king in Milan in 1500 on a successful diplomatic mission that she had undertaken to protect Mantua from French invasion. Louis had been impressed by her alluring personality and keen intelligence. It was while she was being entertained by Louis, whose troops occupied Milan, that she offered asylum to Milanese refugees including Cecilia Gallerani, the refined mistress of her sister Beatrice's husband, Ludovico Sforza, Duke of Milan, who had been forced to leave his duchy in the wake of French occupation. Isabella presented Cecilia to King Louis, describing her as a "lady of rare gifts and charm".

==== Lucrezia Borgia ====
A year after her 1502 marriage to Isabella's brother Alfonso, the notorious Lucrezia Borgia became the mistress of Francesco. At about the same time, Isabella had given birth to a daughter, Ippolita, and she continued to bear him children throughout Francesco and Lucrezia's long, passionate affair, which was more sexual than romantic. Lucrezia had previously made overtures of friendship to Isabella which the latter had coldly and disdainfully ignored. From the time Lucrezia had first arrived in Ferrara as Alfonso's intended bride, Isabella, despite having acted as hostess during the wedding festivities, had regarded Lucrezia as a rival, whom she sought to outdo at every opportunity. Francesco's affair with Lucrezia, whose beauty was renowned, caused Isabella much jealous suffering and emotional pain. The liaison ended when he contracted syphilis as a result of encounters with prostitutes.

=== Regency ===
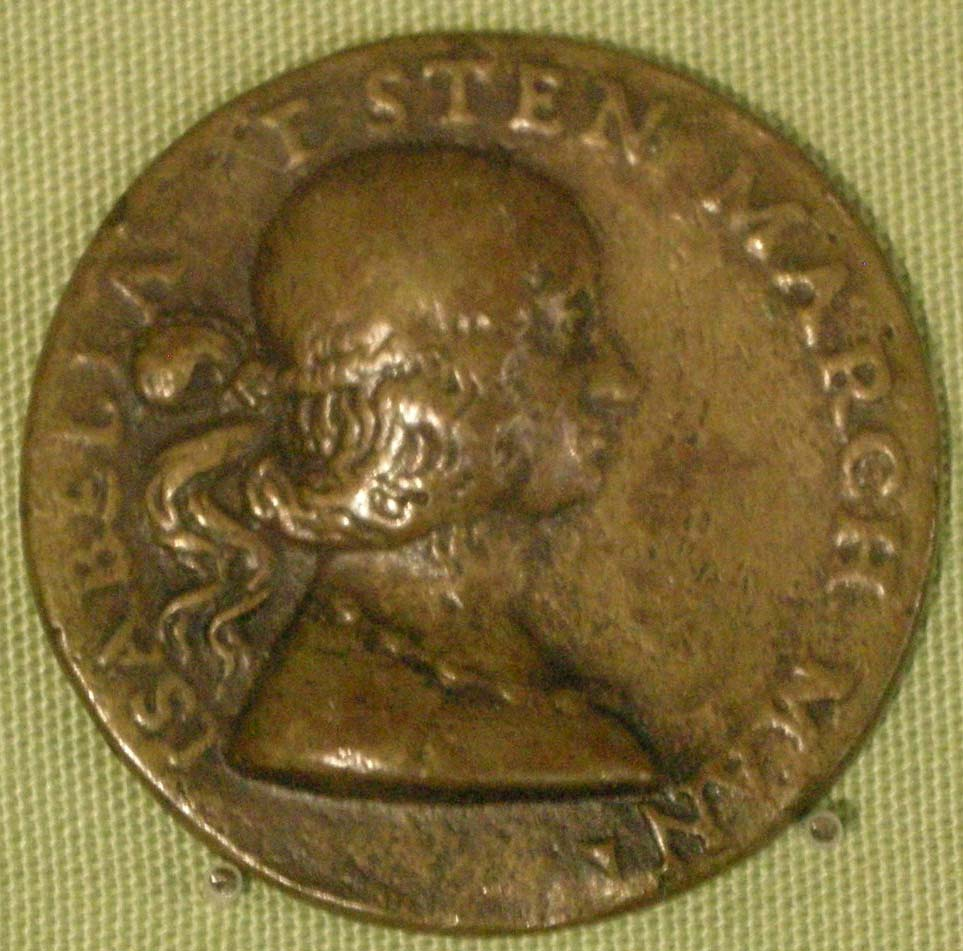
Medail of Isabella, Giovanni Cristoforo Romano

Isabella played an important role in Mantua during troubled times for the city. When her husband was captured in 1509 and held hostage in Venice, she took control of Mantua's military forces and held off the invaders until his release in 1512. In the same year, 1512, she was the hostess at the Congress of Mantua, which was held to settle questions concerning Florence and Milan. As a ruler, she appeared to have been much more assertive and competent than her husband. When her husband was experiencing severe symptoms of his chronic syphilis, Isabella feared contracting the disease. To avoid this, Isabella decided to seek distractions outside of Mantua. She remained in Milan from 1513 to 1514. In this period, Isabella expressed a greater sense of maturation and independence, especially in her travels for diplomatic purposes. Isabella gained a better understanding of her political authority and broadened her cultural perspectives. She wrote frequently to her sick husband to both entertain him and to convey her seriousness as an advocate for Mantua while abroad. However, Francesco was skeptical about her travels and her image as a sophisticated diplomat. When Francesco learned in September 1514 that Isabella had gone to Genoa from Milan of her own accord, he reacted unfavourably. In response, Isabella wrote numerous letters to her husband asking for his forgiveness and apologising for her mistakes.Francesco was furious and humiliated at being surpassed by his wife's superior political ability. This caused their marriage to break down irrevocably. As a result, Isabella began to travel freely and live independently from her husband until his death on 19 March 1519. As years passed, Isabella's eldest son Federico, the new marquis of Mantua, grew tired of listening to his mother's political advice. Freed from this responsibility, Isabella decided to leave Mantua more often. She travelled to various cities, including Rome during the Sack of 1527, allowing her to stay in touch with new cultural and intellectual developments. Her pursuit of uncertain travels and sightseeing allowed her to live boldly, going against the submissive gender beliefs for her sex at the time and allowing her to embrace cosmopolitanism. During such travels, in December of 1514, Isabella visited Naples, also the birthplace of her mother, during her extended journey through Italy. The visit was arranged even though her husband, Francesco Gonzaga, was concerned about her absence from Mantua. These long periods of solo travel go to show Isabella's independence from her husband Francesco.

After the death of her husband, Isabella ruled Mantua as regent for her son Federico. She began to play an increasingly important role in Italian politics, steadily advancing Mantua's position. She was instrumental in promoting Mantua to a Duchy, which was obtained by wise diplomatic use of her son's marriage contracts. She also succeeded in obtaining a cardinalate for her son Ercole. She further displayed shrewd political acumen in her negotiations with Cesare Borgia, who had dispossessed Guidobaldo da Montefeltro, duke of Urbino, the husband of her sister-in-law and good friend Elisabetta Gonzaga in 1502

=== Widowhood ===
==== "Devoted head of state" ====
As a widow, Isabella at the age of 45 became a "devoted head of state". Her position as a Marquise required her serious attention, therefore she was required to study the problems faced by a ruler of a city-state. To improve the well-being of her subjects she studied architecture, agriculture, and industry, and followed the principles that Niccolò Machiavelli had set forth for rulers in his book The Prince. In return, the people of Mantua respected and loved her.

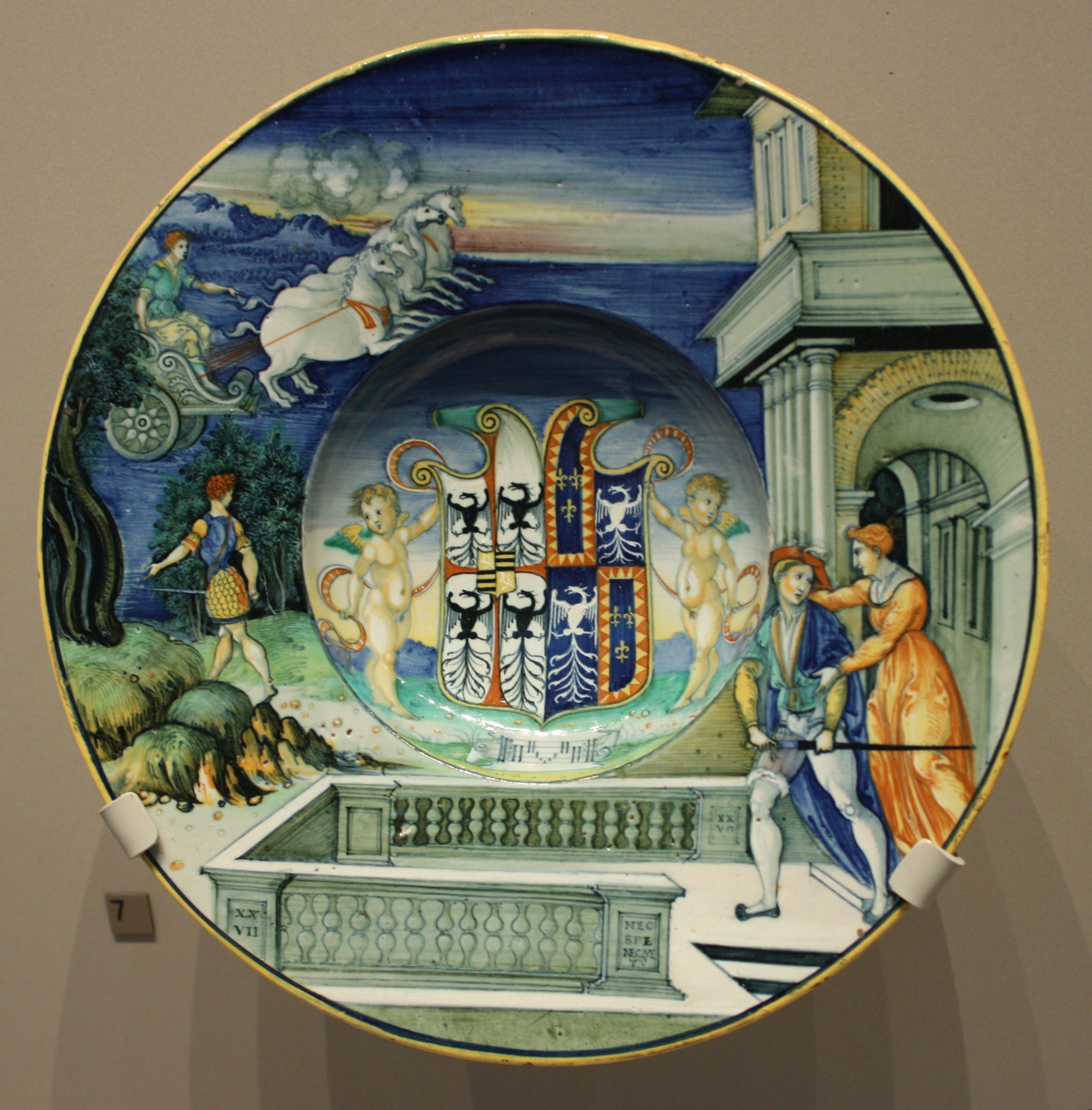
Maiolica plate from Urbino with the arms of Isabella and her late husband, c. 1524 (Victoria and Albert Museum)

Isabella left Mantua for Rome in 1527. She was present during the catastrophic Sack of Rome, when she converted her house, the Palazzo Colonna, into an asylum for approximately 2,000 people (including clerics, nobles and common citizens) fleeing the Imperial soldiers. Her huge palace was the only place safe from attacks, because her son Ferrante Gonzaga was a general in the invading army and she herself had good relationship with the emperor. When she left Rome, she managed to acquire safe passage for all the refugees who had sought refuge in her home.

==== Later years and death ====
Once Rome became stabilized following the sacking, she left the city and returned to Mantua. She made it a centre of culture, started a school for girls, and turned her ducal apartments into a museum containing the finest art treasures. This was not enough to satisfy Isabella, already in her mid-sixties, so she returned to political life and ruled Solarolo, in Romagna. As her last large purchase, Isabella acquired the late Cardinal Sigismondo's countryside castle of Solarolo, in the territory of Faenza, and was responsible for overseeing improvements to the castle and maintaining well documented estate records. Following her death on 13 February 1539, Isabella was buried beside her husband in the Church of Santa Paola in Mantua, but her remains were stolen. French revolutionary troops in control of Mantua in 1797 tore apart the tombs in the Church of Santa Paola, including both her and her husband Francesco's tomb.

== Appearance ==
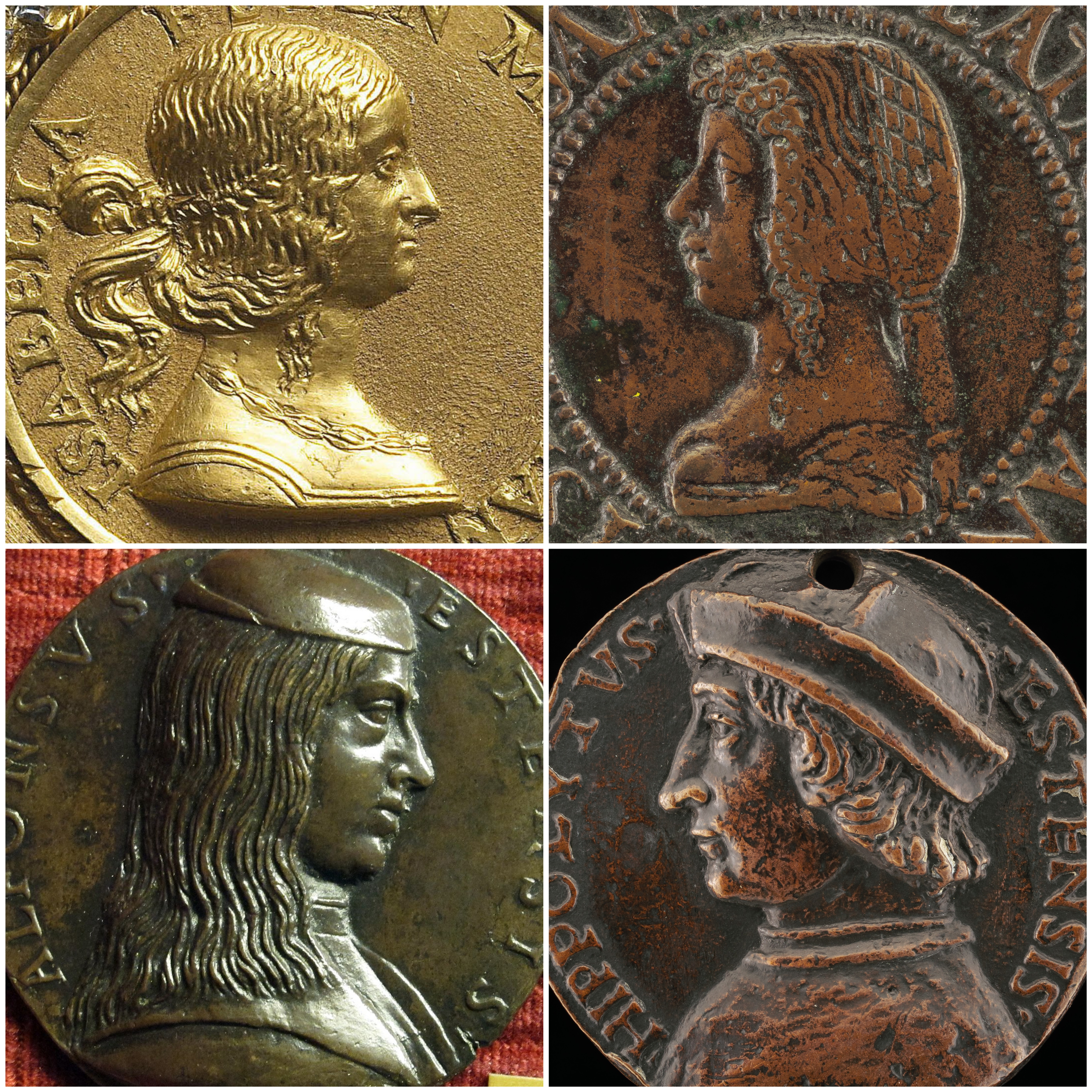
The Este siblings' medals: Isabella, Beatrice, Alfonso, and Ippolito

Isabella's appearance was frequently written about in her lifetime. Mario Equicola said that "her eyes were black and sparkling, her hair yellow, and her complexion one of dazzling brilliancy." Similarly Gian Giorgio Trissino's I Ritratti has a fictionalized Pietro Bembo describe Isabella's "rippling golden hair that flowed in thick masses over her shoulders," in a passage that, according to art historian Sally Hickson, identifies Isabella as the "living paragon of female beauty." The real Bembo praised Isabella's "beautiful and charming hand and pure, sweet voice" in a letter addressed to her. The alleged beauty of Isabella attracted the attention of the king of France, Charles VIII, who asked the chaplain Bernardino of Urbino about her features and attempted to arrange a meeting with her. However, this meeting never took place as shortly after he returned to France.

Isabella herself frequently diminished her own appearance; commenting on his portrait she told Francia that he had "made us far more beautiful by your art than nature ever made us." Likewise she told Trissino that "your praises of us far exceed the truth", and said of Titian's portrait that "we doubt that at the age he represents us we were ever of the beauty it contains." In 1534, in the same year that Titian's portrait was painted, Titian's friend, Pietro Aretino, mocked her appearance, calling her "the monstrous Marchioness of Mantua, with ebony teeth and ivory eyelashes, dishonestly ugly and ultra-dishonestly tarted up." Despite her displays of modesty, Isabella was also known to lose herself in front of a mirror.

Isabella was worried about her weight from an early age. As an adult she discussed her weight with those close to her frequently. In 1499 she sent a portrait by Giovanni Santi to her brother Ludovico Sforza, complaining that it did not resemble her very much "for being a little fatter than me." Ludovico replied that he liked the portrait very much of her and that it was very similar to her, although "somewhat more fat", unless Isabella had "grown fatter after we saw her." In 1509 she complained to her husband that "if she had more to do with running the state she would not have grown fat", while in 1511 her sister Lucrezia complained about an early draft of the Francia portrait that made her look too thin.

Her face became damaged and prematurely aged by Venetian ceruse.

== Legacy ==
During her lifetime and after her death, poets, popes, and statesmen paid tribute to Isabella. Pope Leo X invited her to treat him with "as much friendliness as you would your brother". The latter's secretary Pietro Bembo described her as "one of the wisest and most fortunate of women". The poet Ariosto deemed her the "liberal and magnanimous Isabella". Author Matteo Bandello wrote that she was "supreme among women", and the diplomat Niccolò da Correggio entitled her "The First Lady of the world".

Judgments less imbued with praise, indeed very harsh, were instead expressed by Pope Julius II in disagreement with Isabella's conduct, even went so far as to call her "that ribald whore". A similar judgment had also been expressed by her husband Francesco himself who, now a prisoner of the Venetians, accused his wife of not loving him and of having been the cause of his ruin, referring to her by letter as "that whore of my wife".

== Cultural pursuits ==
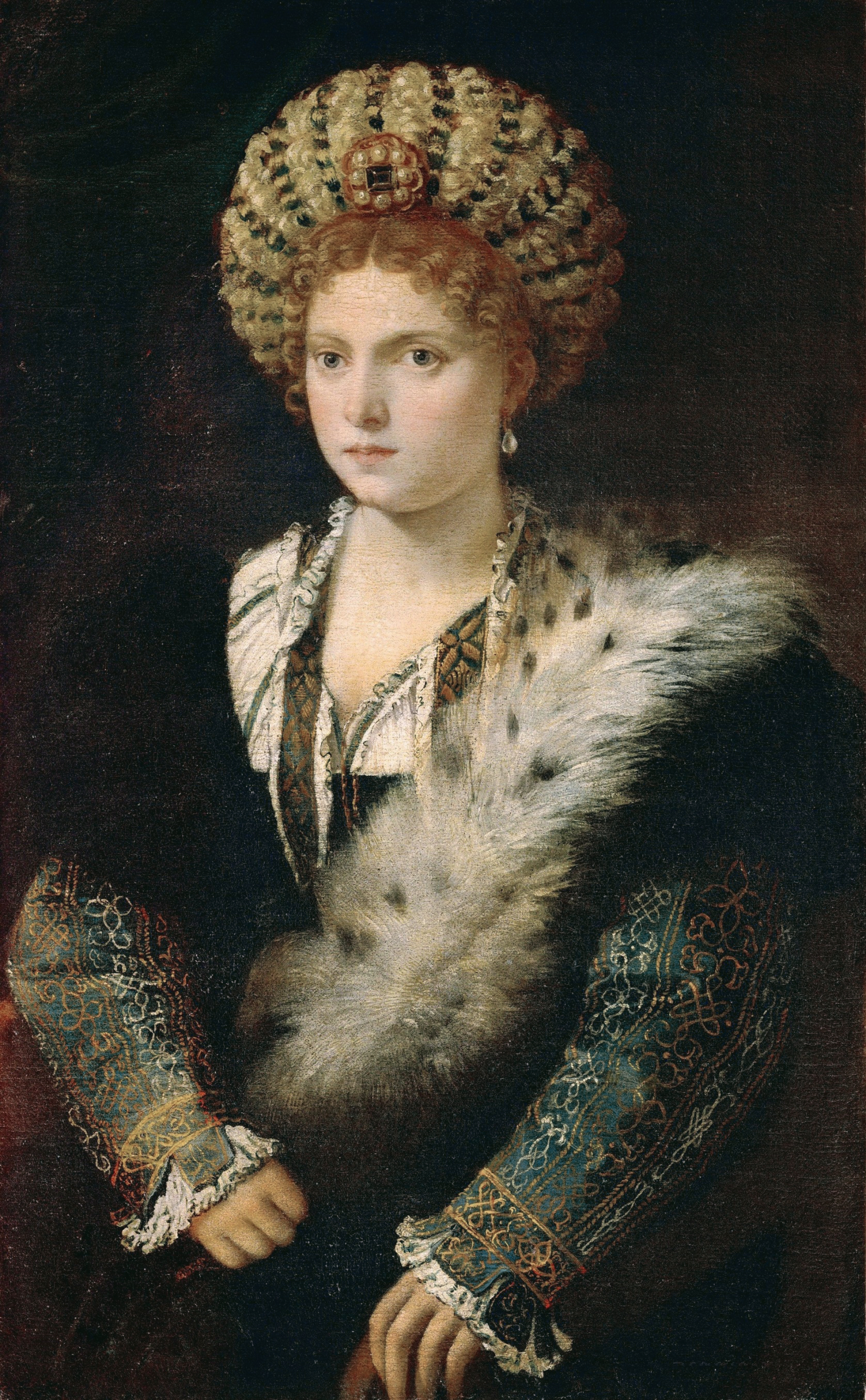
Isabella in Black, presumed to be an idealization of the 62-year-old Isabella by Titian (1536), a widely circulated but uncertain representation

Isabella d'Este is famous as the most important art patron of the Renaissance; her life is documented by her correspondence, which remains archived in Mantua (approximately 28,000 letters received and copies of approximately 12,000 letters written).

=== Art patronage ===
In painting she had numerous famous artists of the time work for her, including Giovanni Bellini, Giorgione, Leonardo da Vinci, Andrea Mantegna (court painter until 1506), Perugino, Raphael, Titian, Antonio da Correggio, Lorenzo Costa (court painter from 1509), Dosso Dossi, Francesco Francia, Giulio Romano, and many others. For instance her 'Studiolo' in the Ducal Palace, Mantua, was decorated with allegories by Mantegna, Perugino, Costa, and Correggio.

In parallel she contracted the most important sculptors and medallists of her time, i.e. Michelangelo, Pier Jacopo Alari Bonacolsi (L'Antico), Gian Cristoforo Romano, and Tullio Lombardo. She also collected ancient Roman art. Beyond her interest in paintings, sculptures, and medals, Isabella was dedicated to collecting antique gems, cameos, and other small, valuable objects, which she displayed in dedicated rooms. One of her most notable collections, however, was her istoriato maiolica service. Isabella collected maiolica from various cities, including Urbino, where her daughter Eleonora Gonzaga was duchess at the time. Eleonora, to smooth her relationship with her mother, commissioned the maiolica master Nicola da Urbino to provide Isabella with maiolica to decorate her palace at Porto. Isabella's maiolica service represents the genius of Nicola da Urbino; he detailed her maiolica with enigmatic emblems and narratives, such as the number XXVII, a number that means to overcome the arrows of misfortune. Urbino emphasized her humanist education and her role as a motherly figure of Mantua in the maiolica, decorating them with scenes that show how she protects her children, like in the Justice of Trajan. Urbino also decorated them with Roman gods, primarily Diana, as she represents female power and purity. Isabella d'Este's collection of mythological panel paintings set her apart from other Renaissance female patrons. Examining this type of patronage, scholars have drawn attention to her relationships with artists, including Mantegna, Bellini, and Perugino.

Isabella d'Este was known for her scented gloves and her interest in perfumes. Her grotta contained silver vessels for perfume and scented water, as well as a perfume burner. The grotta and studiolo were located near two gardens, the Giardino d'Onore and the Giardino Segreto, which contributed to the fragrant atmosphere of her residence.

In music Isabella sponsored the composers Bartolomeo Tromboncino and Marco Cara and she played the lute. Unusually, she employed women as professional singers at her court, including Giovanna Moreschi, the wife of Marchetto Cara.

In the architecture field, she could not afford new palaces, however she commissioned architects such as Biagio Rossetti and Battista Covo.

She was also considered an icon of her time in fashion. Famous is her Balzo as headwear – documented as her invention in letters circa 1509 and visible several times in portraits of other ladies in the 1520s/30s. Fashion was a political tool for Isabella, helping her pursue diplomacy, networking and rule alongside her husband Francesco. According to Cockram's research, during the Italian Wars she could signal political allegiance through her clothing, for example by wearing fleurs-de-lys or Spanish blouses, and she used her reputation as a trendsetter as leverage with more powerful states.

=== Personal adornment ===
Isabella established herself as an innovator in fashion, cosmetics, and interior styling, a reputation supported by records of her purchasing habits and art patronage. Beyond mere interest, she developed custom fragrances, swapped recipes for the court, and partnered with specialists to invent unique apparel and jewelry.

=== Literary patronage ===
For what concerns writers, she was in contact with Pietro Aretino, Ludovico Ariosto, Pietro Bembo, Baldassare Castiglione, Mario Equicola, Gian Giorgio Trissino, and others. While staying in contact with these writers, Isabella used literature for reading, collecting, display, gift exchange, and relationship-building. Isabella also relied on these personal connections to acquire new literary works, directly requesting from authors such as Matteo Maria Boiardo for recently written sections of his Orlando innamorato. Her library was unusually extensive for a woman of her period: a post-mortem inventory of Isabella's possessions listed 133 books, approximately half (66) of them manuscripts, with a relatively small proportion of devotional works compared with other elite women's collections.

== Portraits ==
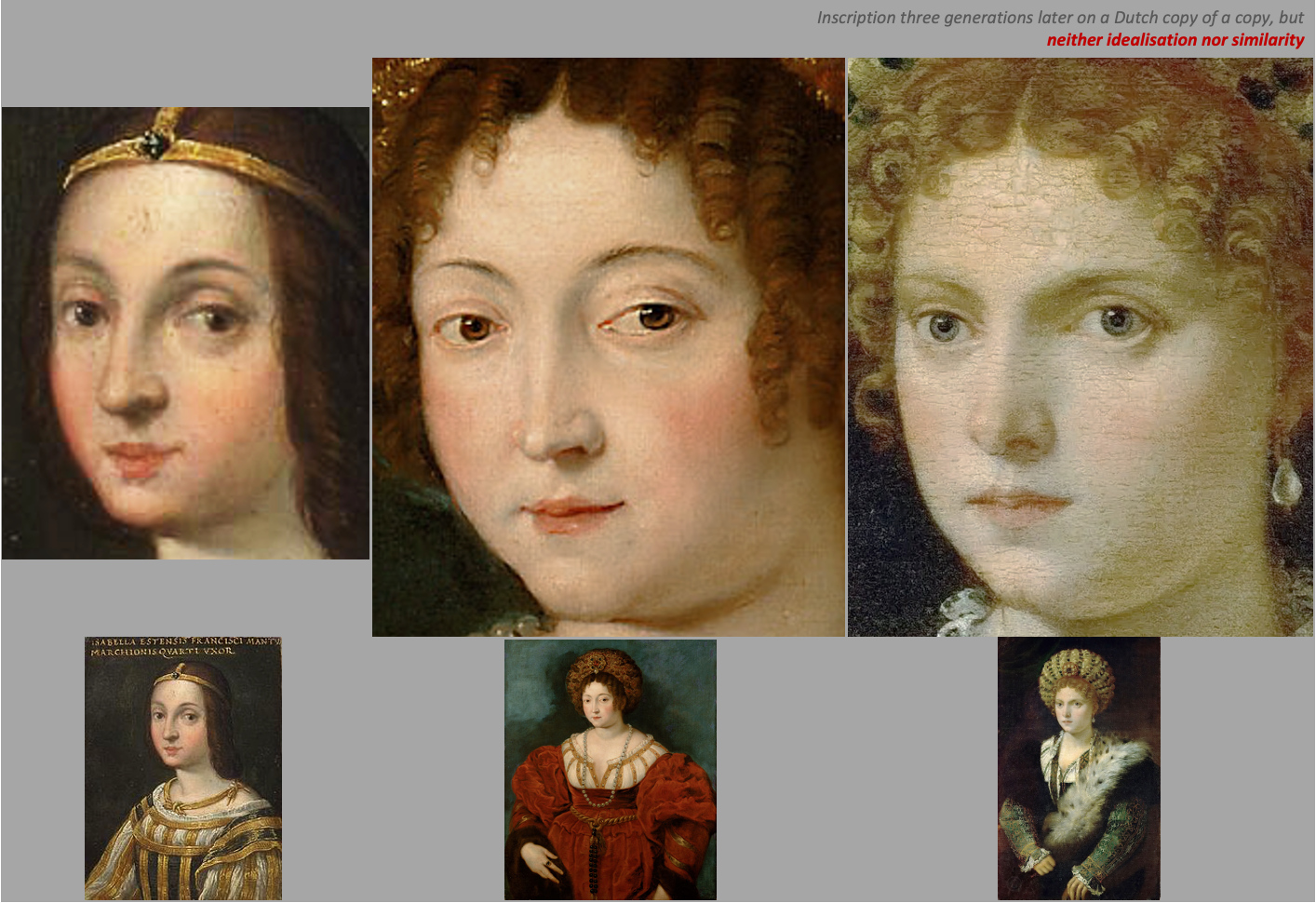
Colour portraits of Isabella d'Este in the KHM, Vienna – perhaps including mix-up?

Despite her significant art patronage that included a number of portraits, there are very few surviving portraits that may be identified as Isabella, especially when compared to her sister Beatrice. It is known that the elderly Isabella preferred idealized paintings and even waived sitting as a model. However, it may be presumed that she insisted nonetheless on seeing her personal characteristics in the outcome. These few identifications are known as inhomogeneous (i.e. differing eye and hair colours as well as divergent eyebrows in two Titian portraits).

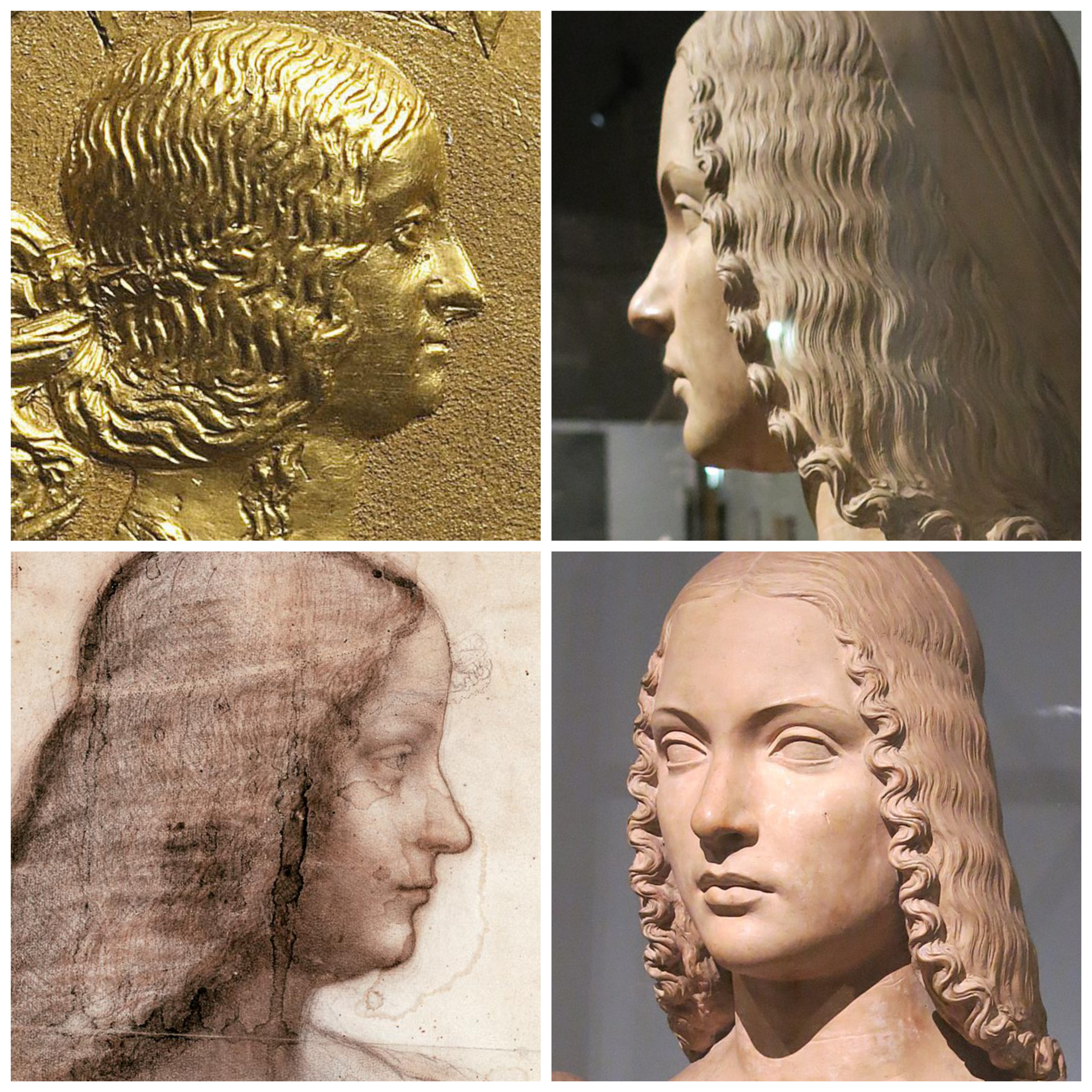
Comparison between an alleged bust of Isabella, attributed to Gian Cristoforo Romano, and two of her portraits: the very certain one of the same sculptor and the almost certain one of Leonardo da Vinci. There are some differences compared to the latter: in the torso the double chin is completely missing, the chin is more marked, the nose more thinned, the forehead less rounded and more generally the face appears less full; however, it cannot be excluded that it may be an idealized portrait of her.

In 1495 she refused with absolute rigor to pose for Mantegna in the Madonna della Vittoria – where her figure was provided next to that of her husband – since in the past the painter had portrayed her "so badly done" – in a painting that in fact has not survived – "which has none of my similarities". However, the negative judgment of the Marquise was not due to Mantegna's inability to portray her similar to the truth, as she herself writes, but to the opposite lack: of not knowing how to "well counterfeit the natural", that is idealize. Her husband Francesco had to pose alone and Mantegna remedied the disturbance of the symmetry by painting, in place of the Marquise, St. Elizabeth, his eponymous saint.

In recent years several museums have withdrawn their few identifications of portraits as Isabella because of concern about possible misidentification.

The remaining three colourful portraits are still inhomogeneous (Kunsthistorisches Museum/KHM, Vienna):

- Ambras Miniature, 16th century
- Isabella in Red by Titian, c. 1529 (lost, known from a copy by Peter Paul Rubens c. 1605)
- Isabella in Black by Titian, 1536

La Bella (now in Palazzo Pitti, Florence) has been discussed as an alternative to Titian's 1536 portrait in Vienna, because the commission from the 60-year-old patron was for a rejuvenated portrait; if La Bella were Isabella, eye colour, hair colour, eyebrows, and general appearance would homogenize in all known portraits, allowing potential links toward further identifications.

As of 2021, the 1495 medal by Gian Cristoforo Romano (several extant copies) is the only reliable identification because of the inscription created during Isabella's lifetime.

Idealised portraits still show characteristics of the person. The following characteristics can be derived (characteristics of the disputed Isabella in Black are excluded):

- From her medal (Giovanni Cristoforo Romano) wavy hair, preferred hairstyle with sidelocks and a (small) double chin.
- From the coloured depictions Ambras Miniature and Isabella in Red red-brown / 'medium-blond' hair and brown eyes under curved eyebrows.
- Isabella preferred idealisation (ideal of beauty, rejuvenation, simplification etc.).
- Additionally: The balzo was common in the 1530s, probably not yet in the 1510s.
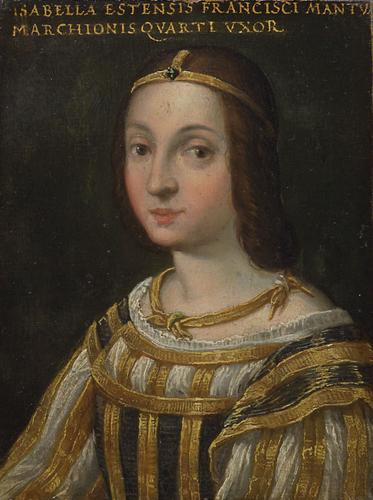
Miniature portrait (with inscription) as a copy of an unknown Mantuan artist, KHM Wien, 16th century

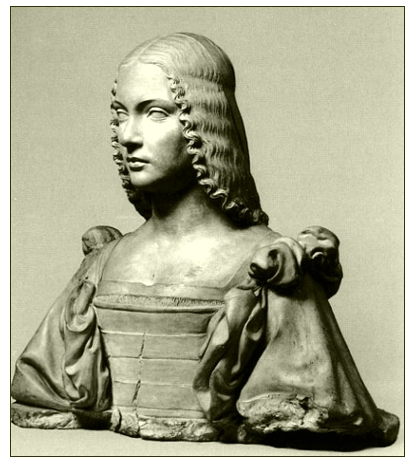
Bust, Giovanni Cristoforo Romano, Kimbell Art Museum, c. 1500

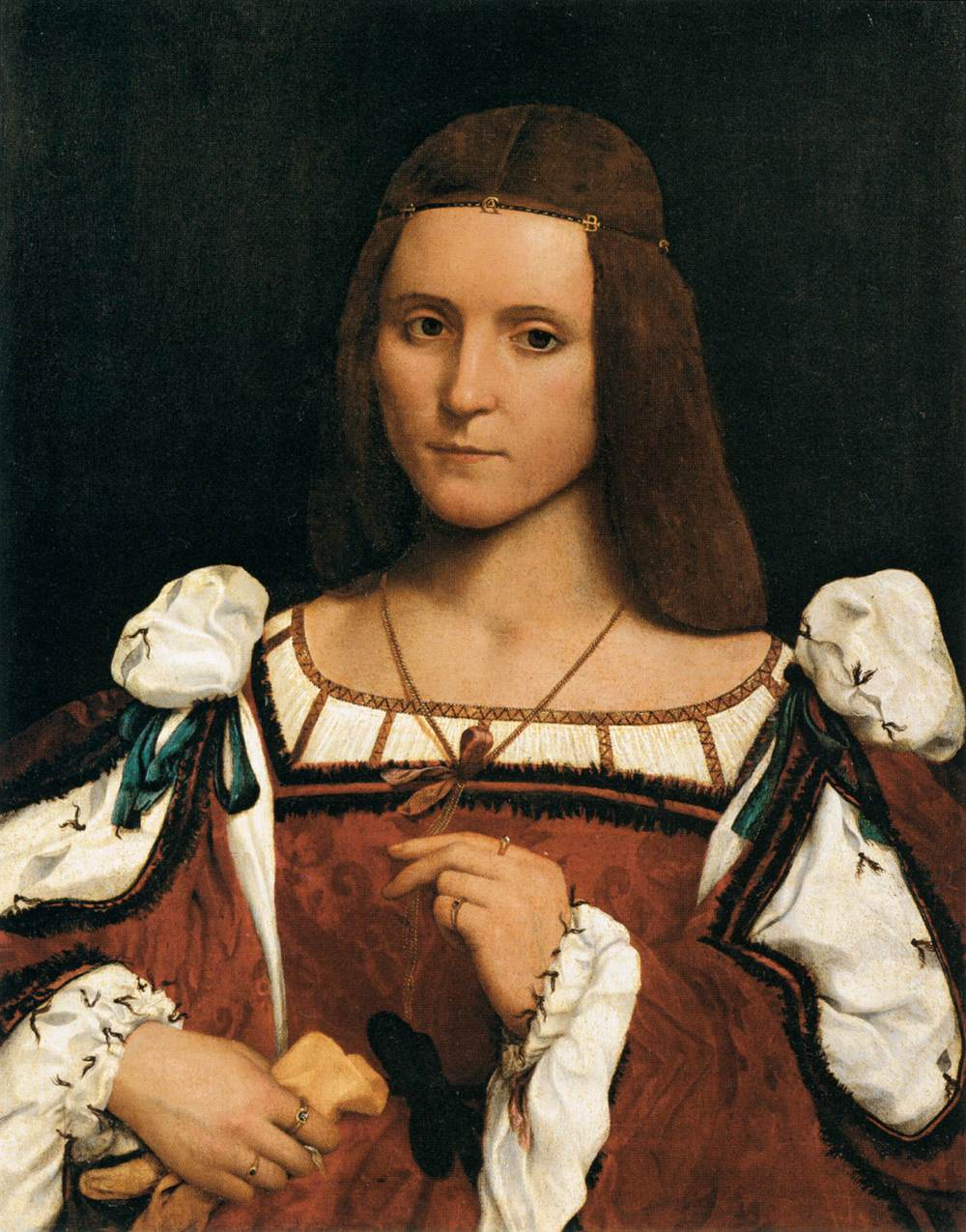
Female portrait by Giovanni Francesco Caroto, Louvre, c. 1505–1510

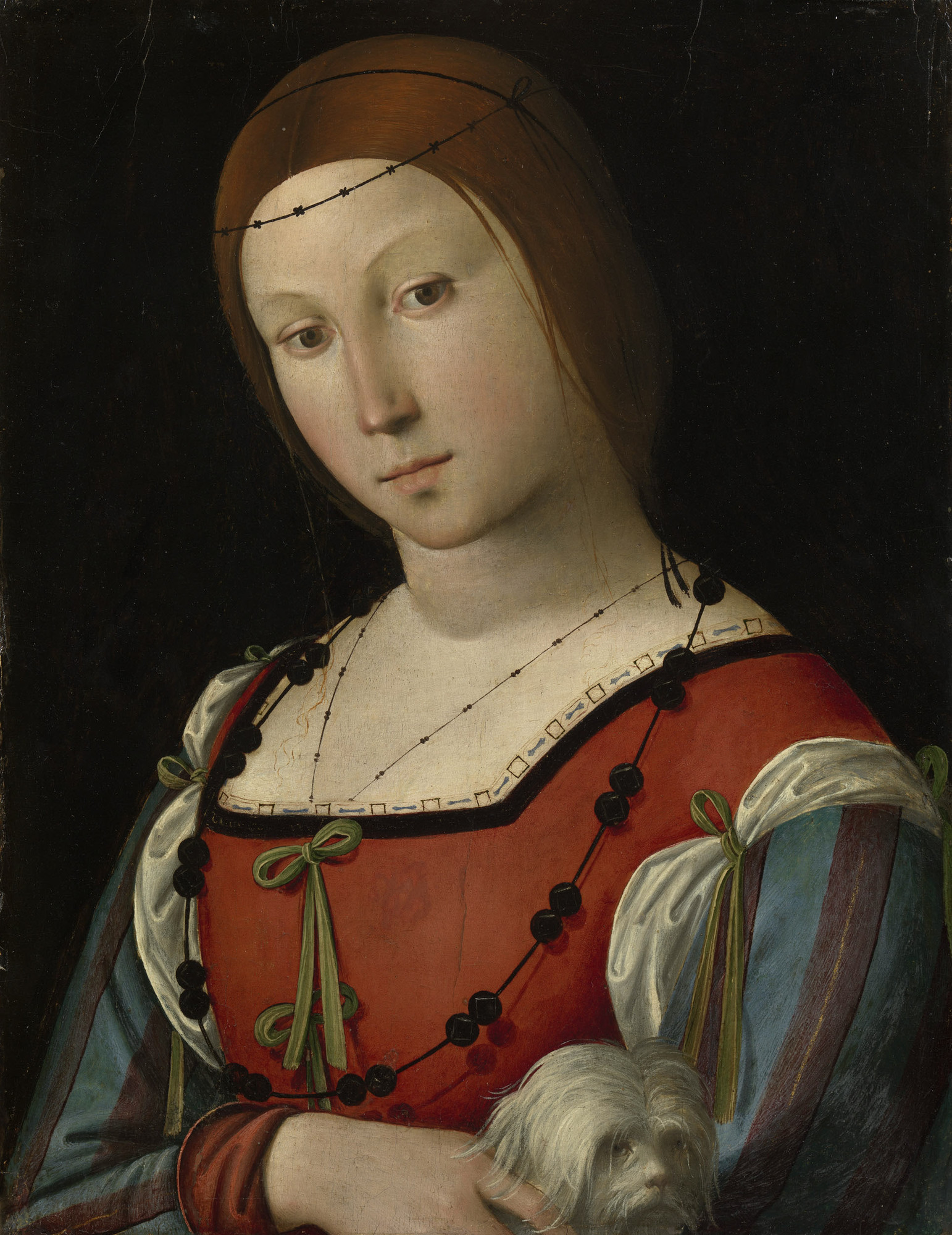
Portrait of a Lady with a Lapdog, Lorenzo Costa, Royal Collection Windsor Castle, c. 1500

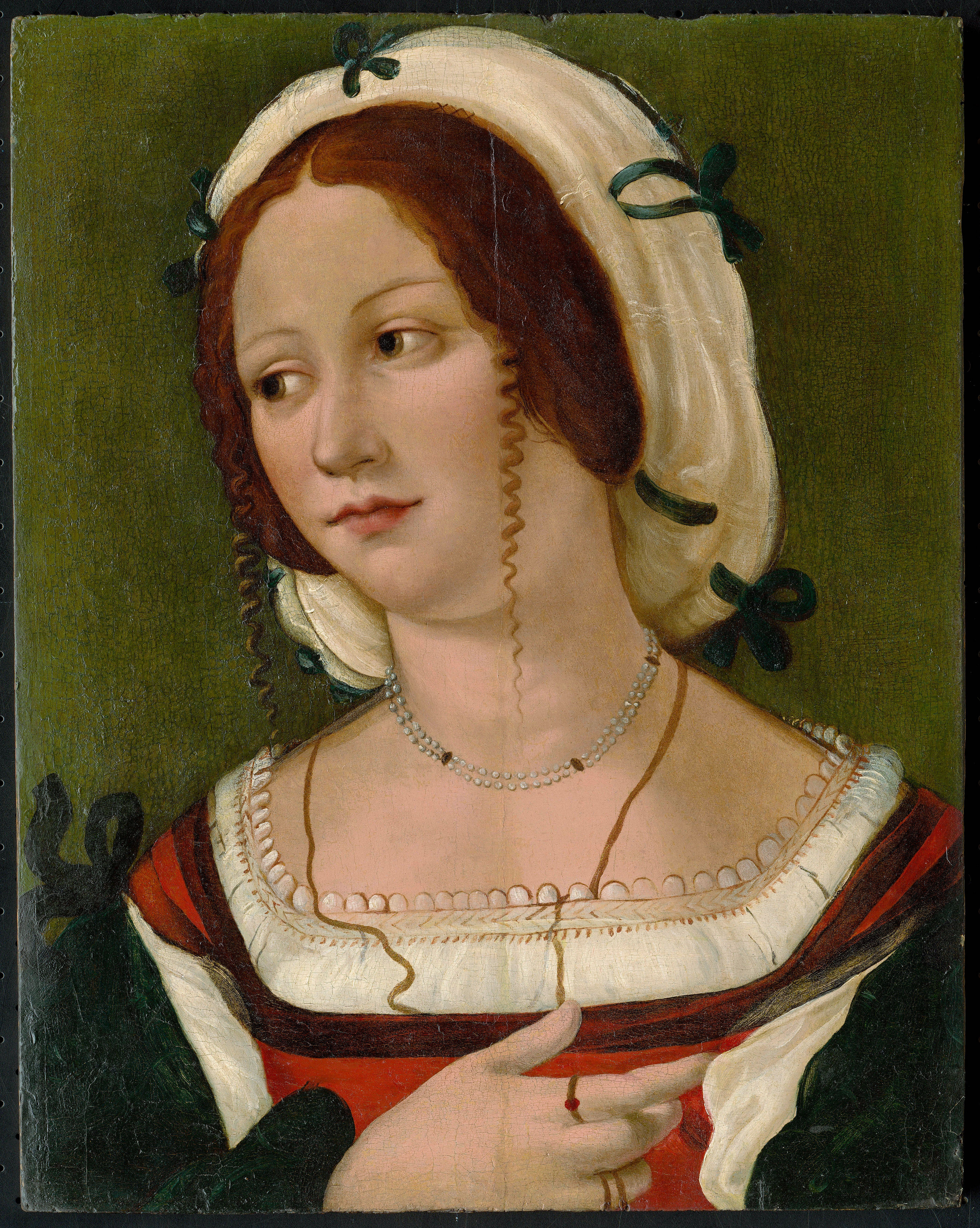
Female portrait by Francesco Francia, c. 1511

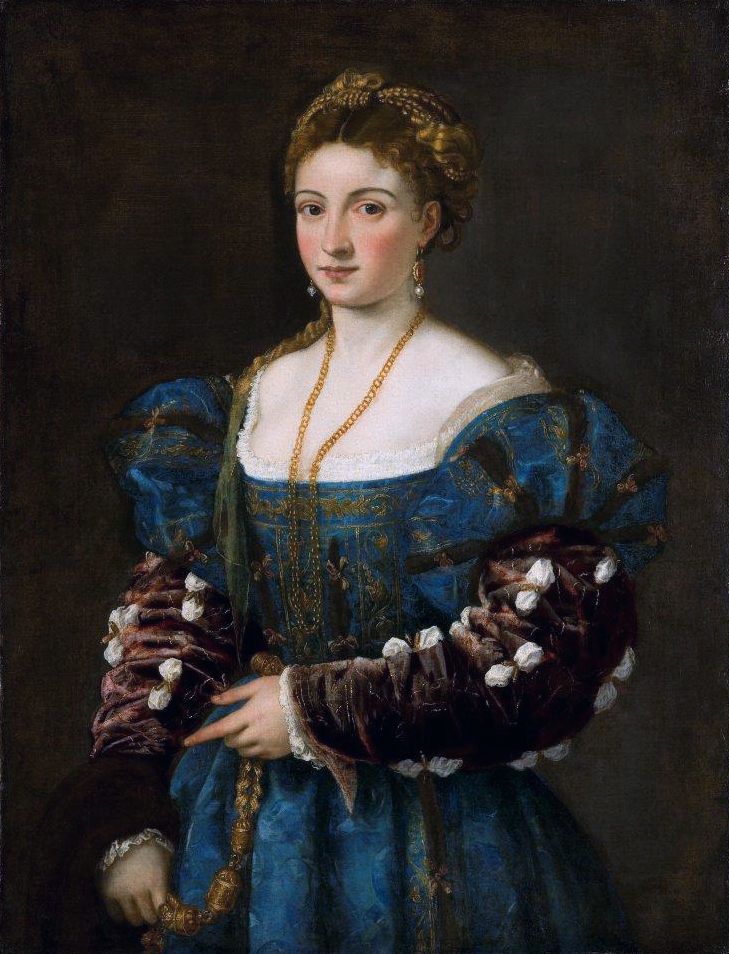
La Bella, ideal portrait by Titian assumed as Isabella d'Este or Eleonora Gonzaga, Galleria Palatina, 1536

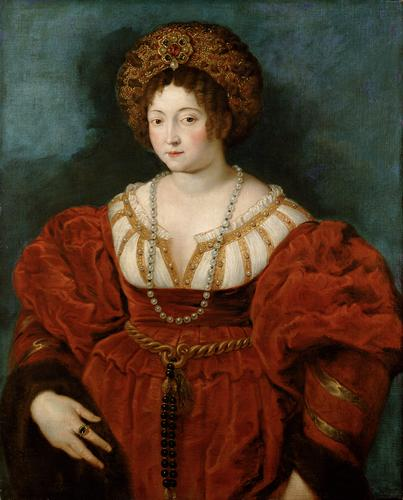
Isabella in Red as a copy by Rubens, Kunsthistorisches Museum, c. 1605

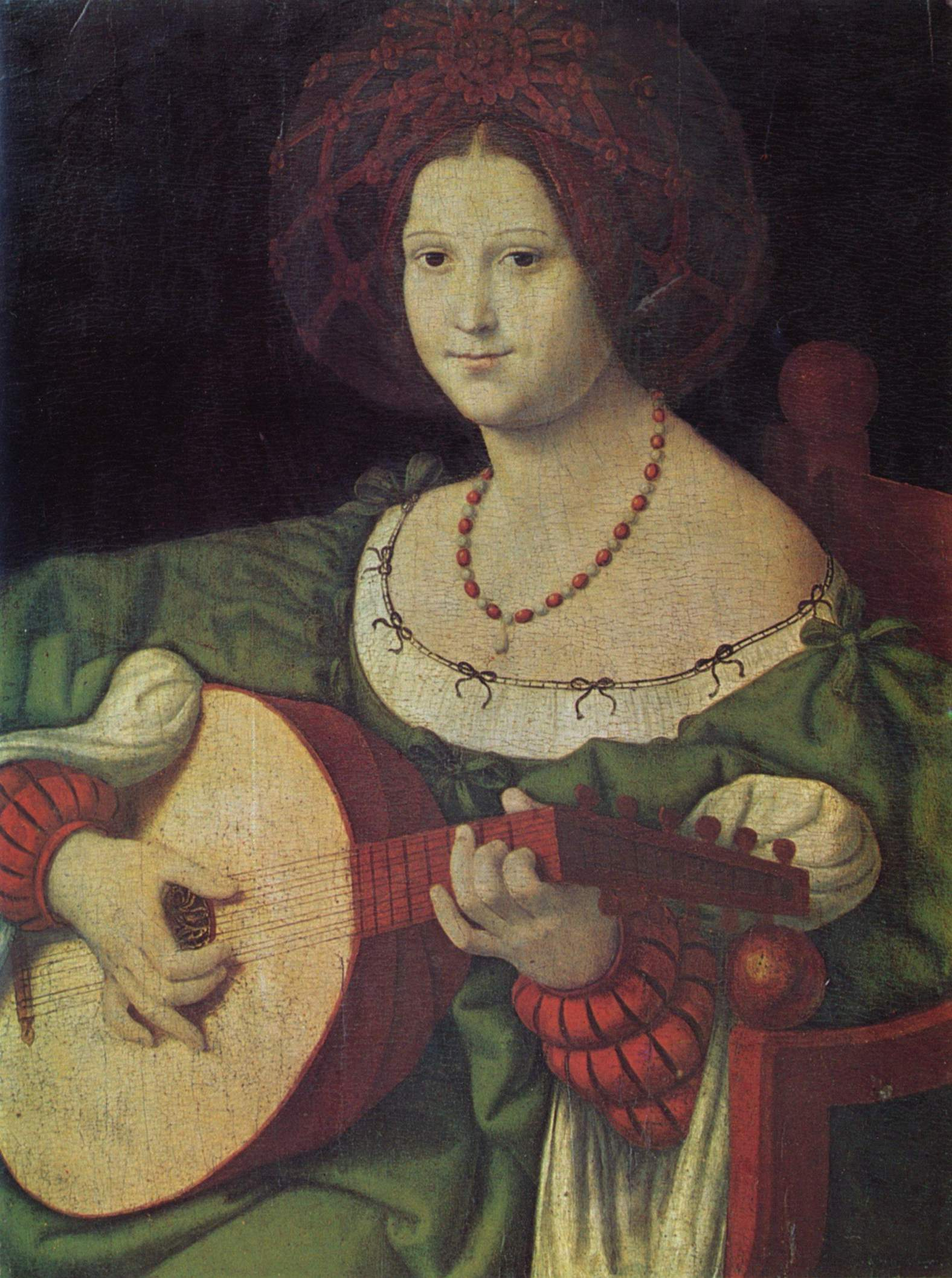
The Lute Player by Andrea Solario, Palazzo Barberini, c. 1510

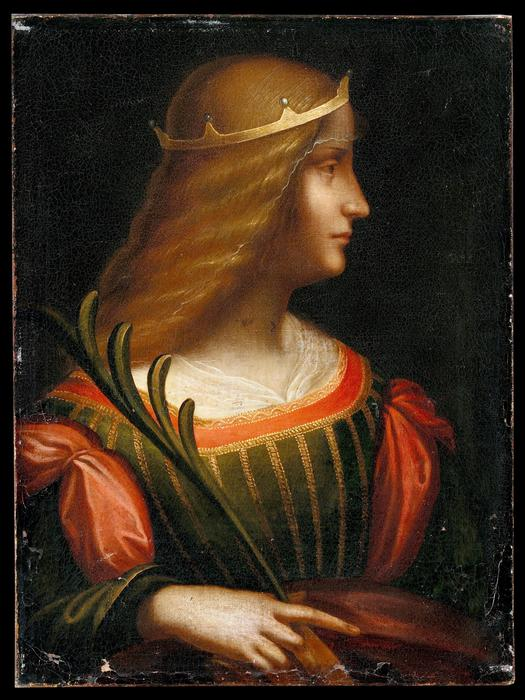
Anonymous painting after Leonardo da Vinci's drawing Isabella d'Este, 16th century, private collection.

=== Relationship with Leonardo and Mona Lisa theory ===
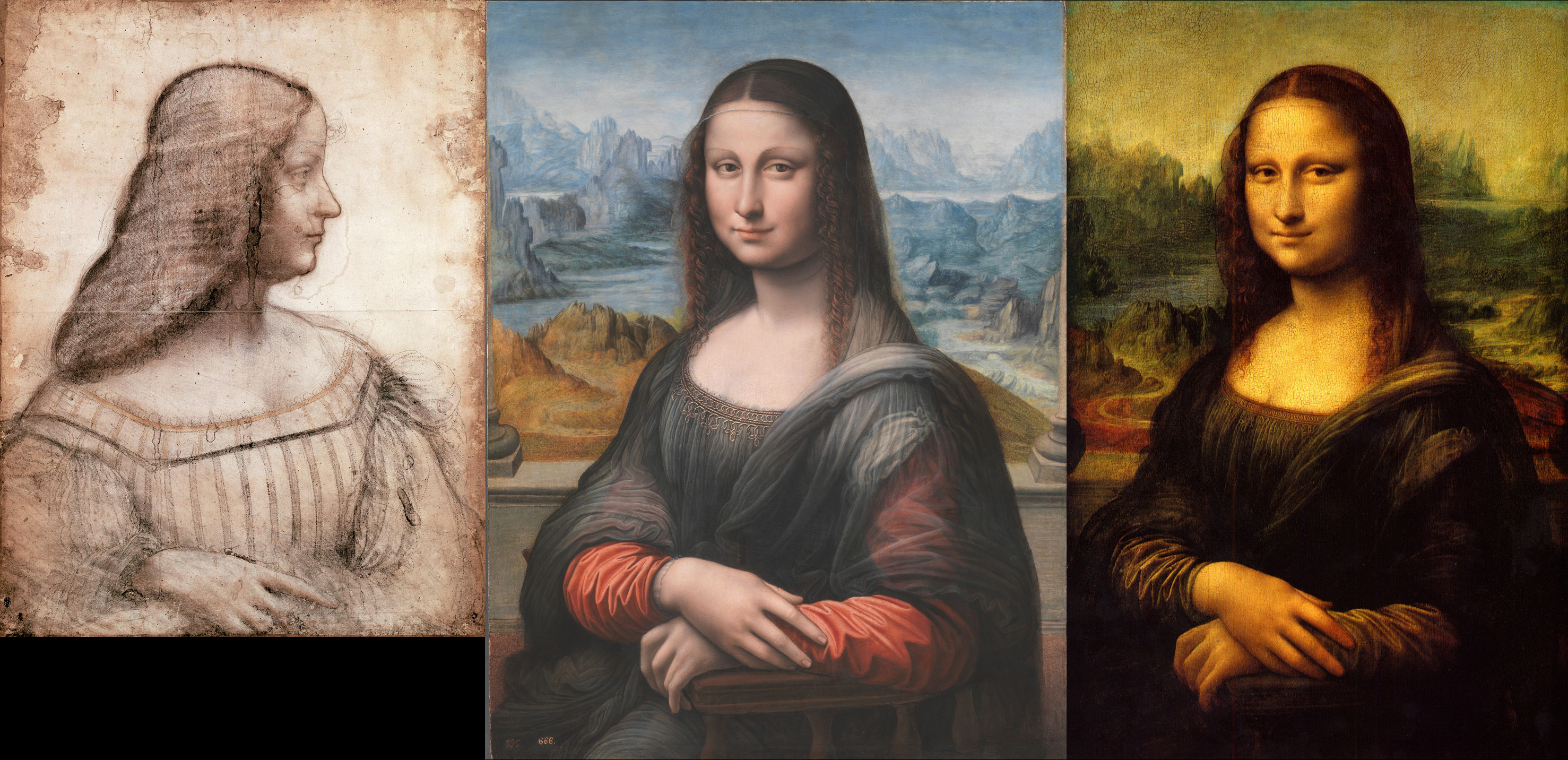
Leonardo: Isabella d'Este (1499) / Leonardo (workshop) Mona Lisa (Prado) (1506–1519) / Leonardo: Mona Lisa (1503–1506)

In the current catalogue raisonné of Leonardo da Vinci (2019), only Isabella d'Este is documented as a plausible alternative as the subject of Leonardo's Mona Lisa, usually considered a portrait of Lisa del Giocondo. Lisa was the wife of a less known merchant in Florence and Giorgio Vasari wrote of her portrait by Leonardo, – in debate that persists about whether this is the portrait now known as the Mona Lisa. No visual comparisons are known for Lisa del Giocondo's and the format speaks in favour of a wealthy art patron.

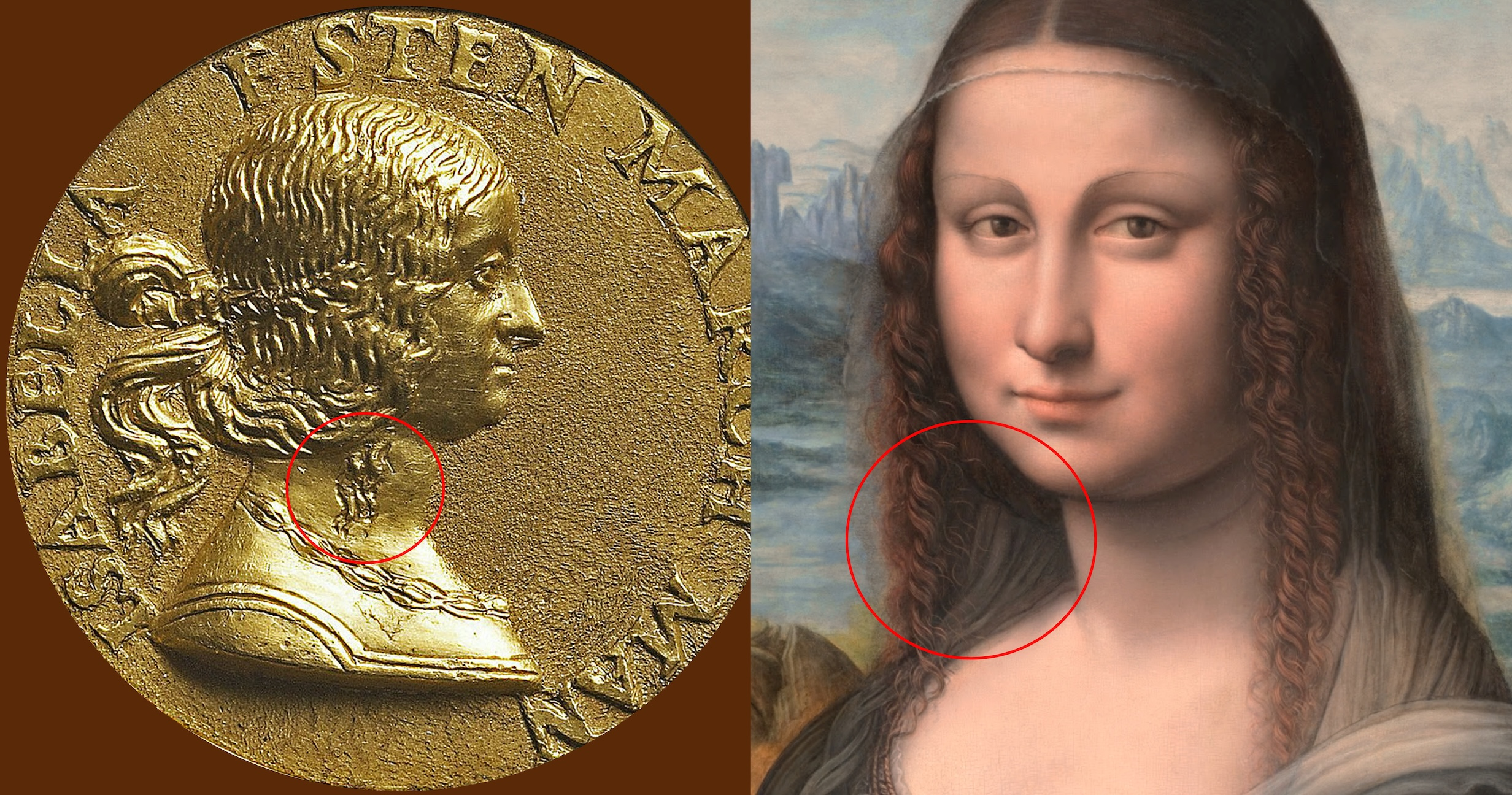
Matching hairstyle: Portrait medal by Gian Cristoforo Romano (1496-1505) / Mona Lisa (Prado) by his workshop 1506–19)

Evidence in favor of Isabella as the subject of the famous work includes Leonardo's drawing 'Isabella d'Este' from 1499 and her letters of 1501–1506 requesting the promised painted portrait. Further arguments focus upon the mountains in the background indicating the native origin of the subject, and the armrest in the painting as a Renaissance symbol used to identify a portrait as that of a sovereign. The cleaned Prado copy from the Leonardo workshop also confirms the hairstyle shown on Isabella d'Este's portrait medals: hair tied up and temple curls. The Louvre's reservation was (in 1975) that Isabella would be a "blonde", a feature that exists only in the widely circulated but uncertain representation Isabella in Black.

== Issue ==
Together Isabella and Francesco had:

- Eleonora Gonzaga (31 December 1493 – 13 February 1570), married Francesco Maria I della Rovere, Duke of Urbino, by whom she had issue
- Margherita Gonzaga (13 July 1496 – 22 September 1496)
- Federico II Gonzaga, Duke of Mantua (17 May 1500 – 28 August 1540), married Margaret Paleologa, by whom he had issue
- Livia Gonzaga (1501 – January 1508)
- Ippolita Gonzaga (13 November 1503 – 16 March 1570), who became a nun
- Ercole Gonzaga (23 November 1505 – 2 March 1563), Cardinal, Bishop of Mantua
- Ferrante Gonzaga (28 January 1507 – 15 November 1557), a condottiero; married Isabella di Capua, by whom he had issue
- Livia Gonzaga (August 1508 – 1569), who became a nun

== Household slaves ==
Correspondence exchanged by Isabella documents the Renaissance European tendency to perceive black African slaves as exotic. According to her extant correspondence, Isabella put considerable effort into bringing African children into her household. On May 1st, 1491, Isabella wrote to her agent in Venice, Giorgio Brognolo, to procure a young black girl between the ages of one-and-a-half and four. In two following reminders sent to Brognolo in early June, she emphasized that the girl be "as black as possible." In her correspondence with her sister-in-law, Anna Sforza, in late June 1491, they discussed their treatment of their very young black maidservants. This revealed that Isabella already possessed an older African girl—whom she referred to as the "best buffoon in the world." Later in June, Brognolo reported back that he had found a four-year-old black girl, who was a daughter of a free African gondolier in Venice. However, Isabella failed to acquire her as her mother, Eleonora d'Aragona, had already invited the girl and her family to enter the service of her household in Ferrara. Persisting in her search, Isabella procured two other black African children from Venice: one two-year-old girl from a Venetian orphanage, one boy from a Venetian patrician household. In 1497, she purchased a black girl from her sister-in-law Chiara Gonzaga.

== Depiction in modern media ==
The artwork The Dinner Party by Judy Chicago features a place setting for Isabella d'Este.

Isabella d'Este was portrayed by Belgian actress Alexandra Oppo in the television show Borgia (2011–2014).

Isabella d'Este was depicted as a vampire in the video game Vampire Therapist (2024). The game chronicles Isabella's life and the fate of the Gonzaga house.

Isabella d'Este is the subject of a novel by the historian and bestselling novelist Sarah Dunant, The Marchesa, published by Whitefox in 2025, is based on her archive of letters in Mantua and includes illustrations. While ostensibly fiction, it is historically accurate.

== Bibliography ==
- Bini, Daniele, ed. (2001). Isabella d'Este: La primadonna del Rinascimento. Daniele Bini. ISBN 88-86251-45-9.
- Bonoldi, Lorenzo (2015). Isabella d'Este: La Signora del Rinascimento. Guaraldi. ISBN 978-88-6927-011-6.
- Cartwright, Julia Mary (1903a). Isabella d'Este, marchioness of Mantua, 1474–1539: a study of the renaissance. Vol. 1. New York, E.P. Dutton and company.
- Cartwright, Julia Mary (1903b). Isabella d'Este, marchioness of Mantua, 1474–1539: a study of the renaissance. Vol. 2. New York, E.P. Dutton and company.
- Cartwright, Julia Mary (1945). "Beatrice d'Este, Duchessa di Milano". Milano. Edizioni Cenobio. ISBN 1406754110.
- Chambers, David; Martineau, Jane (1981). Splendours of the Gonzaga. Victoria & Albert Museum. ISBN 0-317-30092-X.
- Condra, Jill (2008). The Greenwood Encyclopedia of Clothing Through World History. Vol. 2. Westport, CT: Greenwood Publishing Group. ISBN 9780313336621.
- Ferino, Sylvia (1994). Isabella d'Este – Fürstin und Mäzenatin der Renaissance. Kunsthistorisches Museum Wien (Vienna).
- Hickson, Sally (2009). "'To see ourselves as others see us': Giovanni Francesco Zaninello of Ferrara and the portrait of Isabella d'Este by Francesco Francia". Renaissance Studies. 23 (3). The Society for Renaissance Studies, Blackwell Publishing Ltd: 288–310. doi:10.1111/j.1477-4658.2009.00565.x. S2CID 261859931.
- Luzio, Alessandro; Renier, Rodolfo (1890). "Delle relazioni d'Isabella d'Este Gonzaga con Lodovico e Beatrice Sforza". Milano. Tipografia Bortolotti di Giuseppe Prato.
- Marek, George R. (1976). The Bed and the Throne: The Life of Isabella d'Este. New York: Harper and Row Publishers. ISBN 978-0-06-012810-4.
- de Mazzeri, Silvia Alberti (1986). "Beatrice d'Este duchessa di Milano". Rusconi. Rusconi. ISBN 9788818230154.
- Mazzi, Maria Serena (2004). "Come rose d'inverno, le signore della corte estense nel '400". Nuovecarte. Nuovecarte. ISBN 9788887527162.
- Mozzarelli, Cesare; Oresko, Robert; Ventura, Leandro (1997). La Corte di Mantova nell'età di Andrea Mantegna, 1450-1550. Bulzoni Editore. ISBN 88-8319-124-2.
- Pizzagalli, Daniela (1999). "La dama con l'ermellino, vita e passioni di Cecilia Gallerani nella Milano di Ludovico il Moro". Rizzoli. Rizzoli. ISBN 9788817860734.
- Pizzagalli, Daniela (2001). "La signora del Rinascimento. Vita e splendori di Isabella d'Este alla corte di Mantova". Rizzoli. Rizzoli. ISBN 9788817868075.
- Valeri, Francesco Malaguzzi (1913). "La corte di Lodovico il Moro: la vita privata e l'arte a Milano nella seconda metà del Quattrocento". Vol. 1. Milano. Hoepli.

Preceded by Margaret of Bavaria	Marchioness of Mantua; 1490–1519	Succeeded by Margaret Palaeologina
