= Paola Gonzaga =

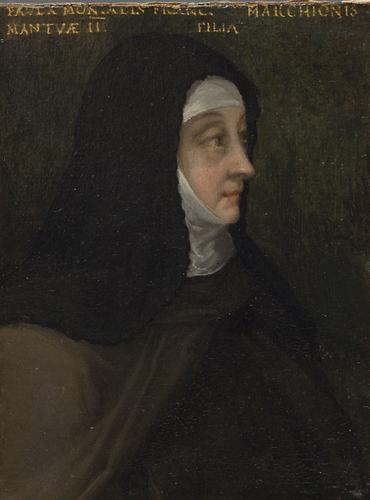
Paola Gonzaga

Livia (Paola) Gonzaga (August 1508 in Mantua – 11 April 1569 in Mantua) was a Mantuan noblewoman.

== Biography ==
Born Livia Osanna Gonzaga, she was the daughter of Francesco II Gonzaga, Marquis of Mantua and Isabella d'Este, daughter of Ercole I d'Este, Duke of Ferrara; and named after an earlier Livia, born in 1503, who died very young. One of her older brothers was Cardinal Ercole Gonzaga; her sister Ippolita became a Dominican nun. She was the sister-in-law of Margherita Paleologa, who married Livia's older brother Federico II Gonzaga, Duke of Mantua, and the niece of Cardinal Ippolito d'Este.

At the age of three years, she was given to the nuns of the convent of Santa Paula in Mantua to be educated. Ten years later she took the monastic habit of the Poor Clares and five years later took vows with the name of Sister Paola. She also became abbess of the convent. She spent her life in the monastery built by Paola Malatesta, wife of Gian Francesco Gonzaga and was also visited by the Emperor Charles V. She was buried in the Church of Santa Paula.
