= La Bella =

1536 painting by Titian

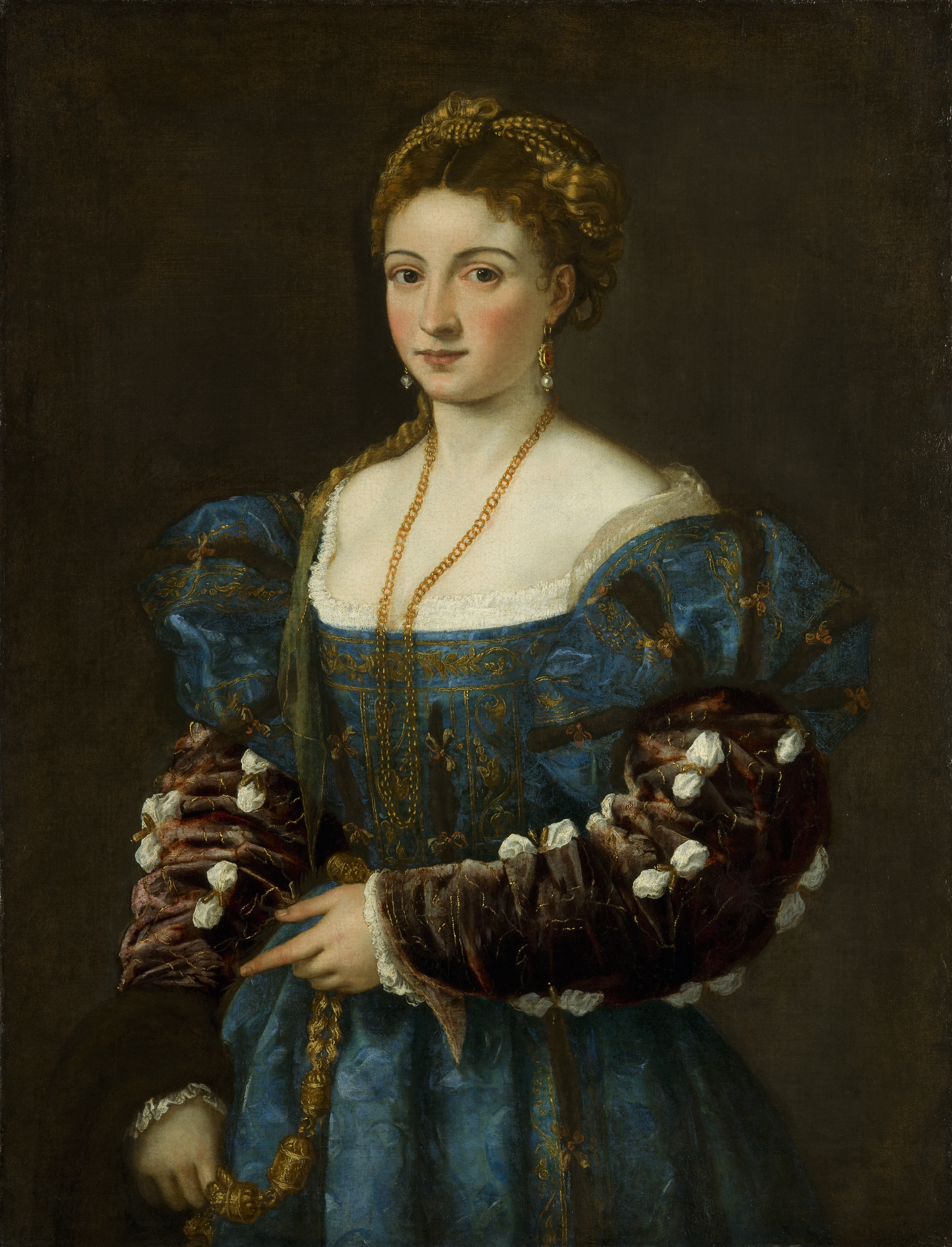
- Artist: Titian
- Year: 1536
- Medium: oil on canvas
- Dimensions: 100 cm × 75 cm (39 in × 30 in)
- Location: Palazzo Pitti; Florence

La Bella is a portrait of a woman by Titian in the Palazzo Pitti in Florence. The painting shows the subject with the ideal proportions for Renaissance women. In parallel the stringent composition corresponds to Titian's real portraits. The work can be dated by a letter about "that portrait of that woman in a blue dress" in May 1536.

== Description ==
The portrait represents a young beauty in a blue dress with decollete and rich gold ornaments against a dark background. She points with her left hand to a zibellino draped over her right forearm. The woman corresponds perfectly to all the ideals of beauty of the time with possibly the only exception of "only medium" blond hair. In parallel, the stringent composition as a three-quarter figure and the rich clothing correspond to Titian's courtly portraits of the 1530s. The head shows similarities with three eroticised paintings by Titian from the same period, although it remains open whether it is the same person, model or ideal of beauty:

- Girl in a Fur, c. 1536, Kunsthistorisches Museum in Vienna
- Girl with Feather Hat, c. 1536, Hermitage Museum in Saint Petersburg
- Venus of Urbino, c. 1538, Uffizi in Florence

== History ==
The painting came to Florence in 1631 as part of the inheritance of Vittoria della Rovere. It is first documented in the della Rovere collection in the inventory of Ducal Palace of Pesaro in 1623/24. Based on this provenance, it is identified as "that portrait of that woman in the blue dress" in a letter from Francesco Maria I della Rovere to his agent in Venice dated 2 May 1536.

=== Letter "that woman in a blue gown" ===
"… You shall say to Titian that we cannot imagine anything better for our lady the Duchess [his wife Eleonora Gonzaga], than what we have spoken of, that is, a Resurrection, which we are certain will please her, and that therefore he must put his soul and thoughts to this, and that he attend to those other things; and [as for] that portrait of that woman in a blue dress, we desire that it be finished, with everything made beautiful, and with the timpano [tympanum, or protective curtain], because that way we will be able to see how the others will turn out …"

"… Direte al Titiano, che noi in effetto non sappiamo pensar' meglio per la signora Duchessa nostra [his wife Eleonora Gonzaga], di quello che si è ragionato, cioè de una Resurectione, della qual' siam' certi che si contentarà, et che però metti pur' L'animo e il pensier' suo a quest, et che attenda a quel'altre cose, et che quel retratto di quella Donna che ha la veste azurra desideriamo che la finisca bella circa il tutto e con il timpano, perché da questo possiam' vedere, come siano per riuscir' gli altri …"

=== Interpretations ===
According to the general interpretation, della Rovere had seen the portrait during his visit to Titian's studio when it was almost finished. He commissioned Titian with works that were apparently related to this third-party commission. Based on similarities (as well as further letters and x-rays), "the others" / "gli altri" should be Titian's Girl in a Fur, Girl with Feathered Hat and Venus of Urbino.

By Moritz Thausing, La Bella was interpreted as a portrait of della Rovere's wife Eleonora Gonzaga, despite her youthful age. This interpretation is rejected nowadays, as the anonymous description "that woman in a gown dress" cannot be explained as being his wife.

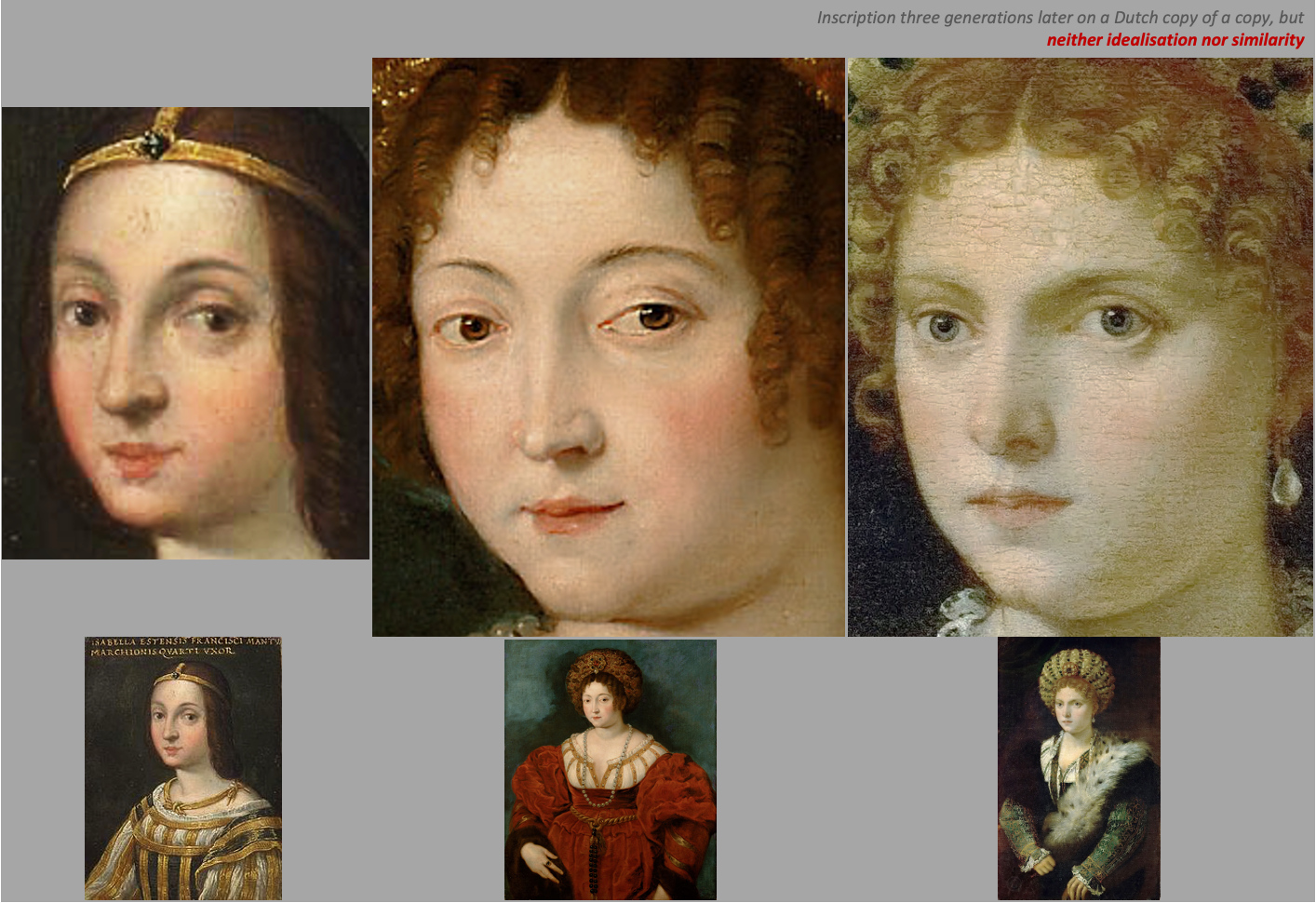
The three portraits Isabella d’Este in colour in the Kunsthistorisches Museum Vienna: maybe including a misidentification?

By Leandro Ozzola, La Bella was published as Isabella d'Este, who is the mother of della Rovere's wife Eleonora (or his mother-in-law). Exactly matching in time, her commission to Titian for a rejuvenating ideal portrait after an older model by Francesco Francia (1511) is documented by Isabella d'Este. La Bella would fit this commission as an ideal beauty (with medium blonde hair), the date of receipt in Mantua (with high praise from Isabella) four weeks later would fit and also the anonymous description to his agent would be explained by the rejuvenation of his over 60-year-old mother-in-law. The commission of a "Resurrection" / "Resurectione" (for his wife) in this case becomes interpretable as an analogous rejuvenation of his wife. Rejuvenations/idealisations ("Resurectione" and "gli altri") would thus also be conceivable in Girl in a Fur (Eleonora Gonzaga?), Girl with Feather Hat and Venus of Urbino. This is indicated by x-rays that show, for example, for Girl in a Fur underpaintings with both La Bella and Titian's portrait Eleonora Gonzaga (c. 1537, Uffizi).

However, Isabella's rejuvenating commission to Titian is claimed by the portrait Isabella in Black in the Kunsthistorisches Museum Vienna, which is considered doubtful (except its Viennese museum documentation). The eventual interpretation La Bella thus depends on the discussion Isabella in Black and "What is idealisation?", since naming the Viennese painting would neither conform to the ideal of beauty nor retain person characteristics (see other portraits of Isabella d'Este in the same museum).

Further attempts to interpret La Bella as a pin-up or courtesan fail because of the stringent portrait composition. And the only thing that really speaks against the noble lineage is the fact that Titian used her appearance in further paintings in which she was depicted in an increasingly erotic manner.

== See also ==
- List of works by Titian
- Portraits of Isabella d'Este
- Isabella in Black
- Girl in a Fur

== Sources ==
- Francesco Valcanover: L'opera completa di Tiziano. Rizzoli, Milan 1969, p. 108–109 or no. 177.
- Mario Ciatti, Fausta Navarro, Patrizia Riitano: Titian’s La Bella: Woman in a Blue Dress. Edifir, Florence 2011, ISBN 978-88-7970-523-3.
- Sylvia Ferino-Pagden: Tizians Frauenbild. exhibition catalogue KHM Vienna, Vienna 2021.
