= Portrait of Isabella d'Este (Titian) =

Painting by Titian

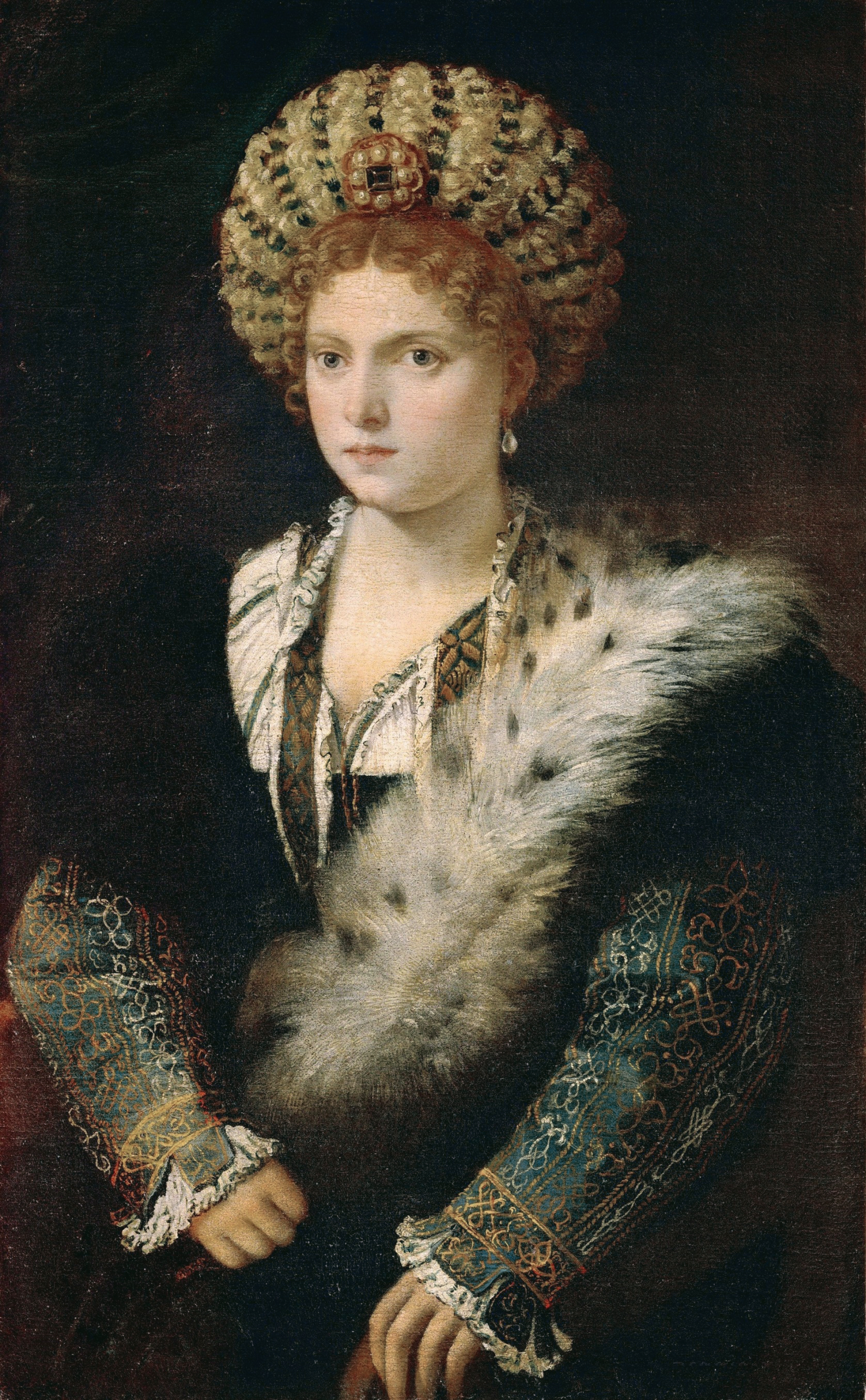
- Artist: Titian
- Year: 1530s
- Type: Oil on Canvas
- Subject: assumed as Isabella d'Este (uncertain identification)
- Dimensions: 102 cm × 64 cm (40 in × 25 in)
- Location: Kunsthistorisches Museum, Vienna
- Accession: GG 83

Portrait of Isabella d'Este (or Isabella in Black) is an oil on canvas painting of a young woman by Titian. It is dated to the mid-1530s and held in the Kunsthistorisches Museum, Vienna. The artist and the date are undisputed. Beyond the museum documentation, there are several doubts about the person depicted, although she is generally assumed to be Isabella d'Este, Marquess of Mantua and one of the most significant cultural and political women of the Italian Renaissance.

The sitter is in three-quarters view, and has blue eyes and a penetrating, confident stare. She is seated and wears lavish and expensive clothing, including fur lining and a large pearl earring and balzo headdress.

== Description ==
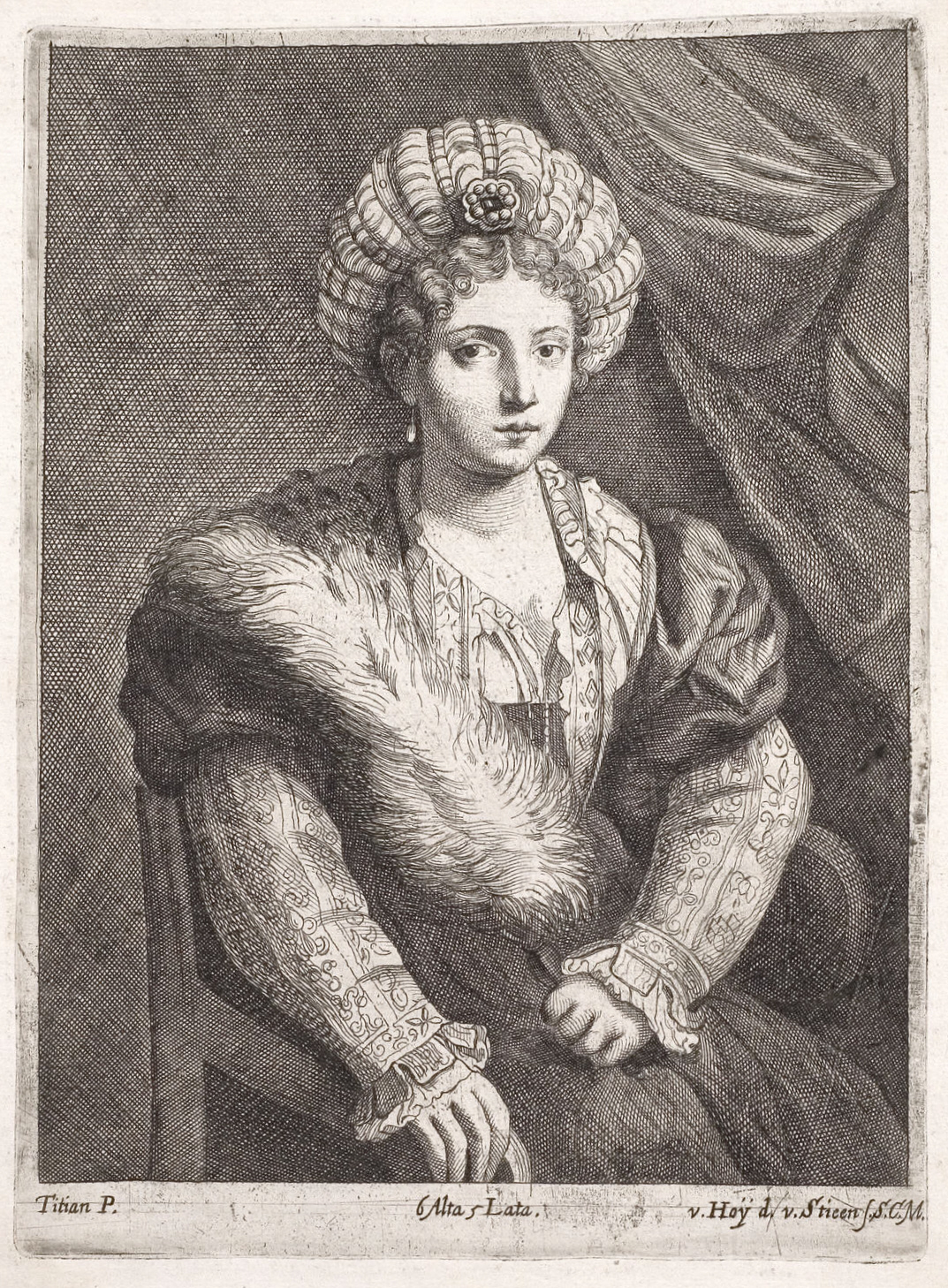
Engraving by Nikolaus van Hoy and Franciscus van der Steen showing the measurements of the original painting as "6 alta 5 lata" (6 palm-widths high by 5 palm-widths wide)

The woman is seated in a chair with an armrest and set against a dark background. She stares slightly to the left. Personal features are her light blond curls, the (rare) eye colour light grey, flat eyebrows and a snub nose — overall not representing the then ideal of beauty. She wears a balzo (a fashion invention of Isabella d'Este (prototypes before 1509), but widely popular in northern Italy in the 1530s). Her clothes are dark; she wears green patterned sleeves, a gold shirt and a fur (probably lynx). The canvas has been trimmed on the left and right.

The painting concentrates on her high social rank, forceful personality, intelligence, and a youthful appearance. Isabella was a collector of antique and contemporary art, and as a powerful patron of culture was in part responsible for developing a highly refined court in Mantua. Because of this, Titian was dependent on commissions and thus keen to flatter his sitters. Although she is portrayed as a much younger woman and the viewer is left in no doubt as to her elevated social status and cultural sophistication, critics felt that her beauty was not idealized. For this reason, the identification has been questioned several times (see below).

She has a small rounded mouth, large oval eyes and dark, low eyebrows. She has pale skin but rosy cheeks and a dimple at the end of her chin. There is a duality in her facial expression; she has soft features, yet her strong and forceful personality is evident, accentuated by the fact that her body is stiff and she sits upright, giving her an air of the imperious.

== History ==
The painting probably passed from the Gonzaga collection in Mantua to the collection of Archduke Leopold Wilhelm of Austria, where it is listed as Catherine Cornaro (Queen of Cyprus) in the inventory in 1659.
An engraving by Lucas Vorsterman of a copy of the painting contains the inscription "E Titiani prototypo P. P. Rubens exc. Isabella Estensis Francisisci Gonzagae March. Matovae uxor". However, this inscription was written three to four generations later in Amsterdam and therefore remains uncertain (cf. the naming Queen of Cyprus).
On the basis of this later inscription, Giovanni Battista Cavalcaselle assigned the painting to a commission from the 60-year-old Isabella d'Este, which has been recorded in letters: Titian was to paint her portrait in 1534 based on a lost 1511 portrait by Francesco Francia. Isabella said that the 1536 portrait "is of such a pleasing type that we doubt that we were ever, at the age he represents, of such beauty that is contained in it." The lost Francia original had already been painted 25 years earlier in absentia based on oral descriptions and a third-party drawing. And the drawing is assumed to be more than ten years older than the one by Leonardo da Vinci (1499/1500). Isabella obviously wanted to be kept youthful and as an (ex-)beauty. Titian's other portrait of the aged Isabella d'Este (Isabella in Red, today only preserved by a Rubens copy in the same museum), had probably not pleased her, which is why this second commission is assumed.
In the 1930s, Wilhelm Suida and Leandro Ozzola opposed this naming as an idealisation of Isabella d'Este. Therefore, only artist and dating were documented as accepted by experts. In the catalogue of the Isabella d'Este exhibition in Vienna (1994), the painting was still marketed as "by the hand of Titian, the 'greatest portrait painter of all time', as the portrait that clearly represents her" with reference to the likely Gonzaga provenance and the no. 367 in the inventory of 1659. Selectively omitted is the fact that no. 367 refers to the painting as Queen of Cyprus. The academic exhibition review again opposed: "but why, when engaged on so professional a face-lift, did Titian use so coarse a canvas?"

== Identity of the sitter ==
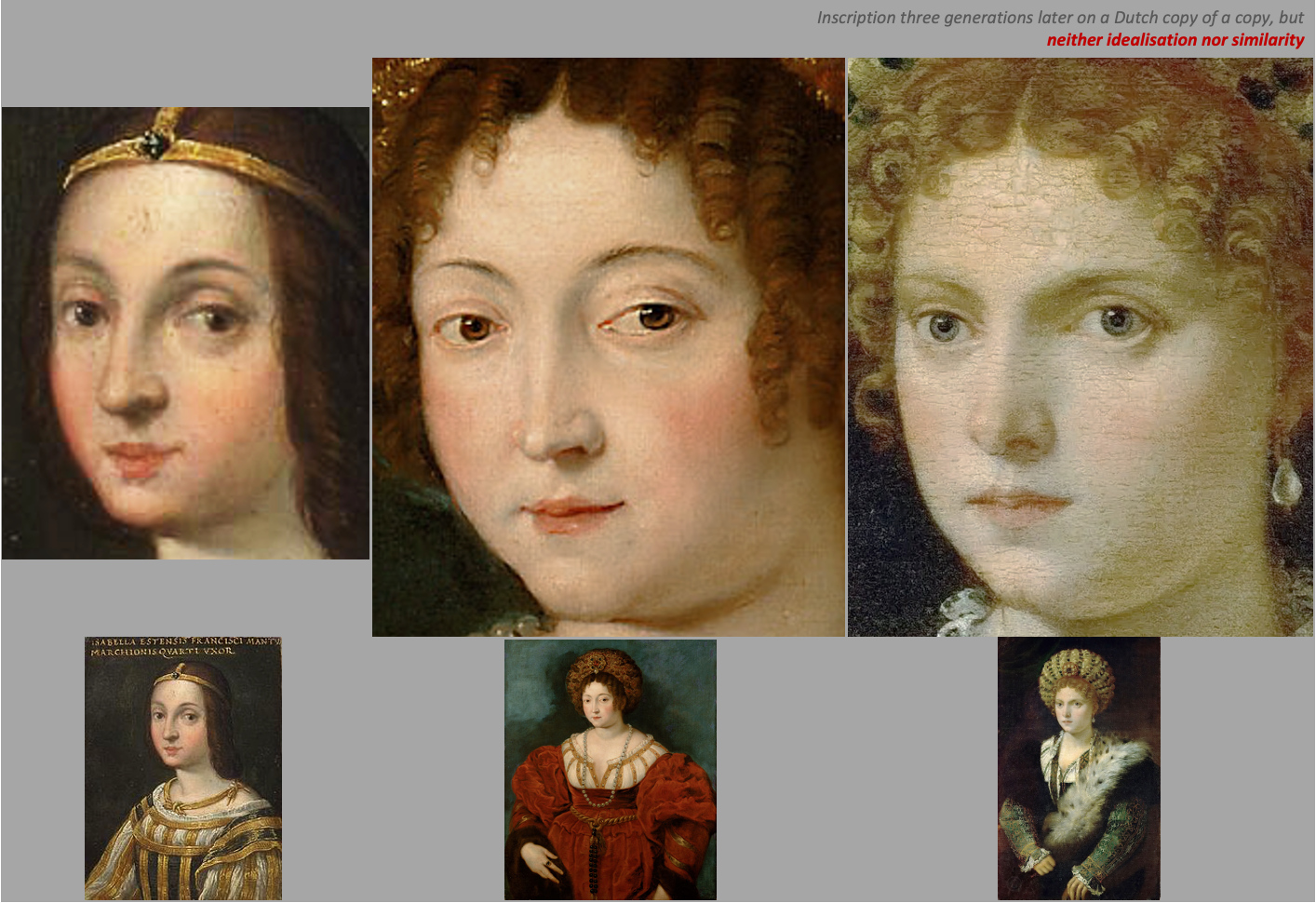
The three portraits in colour in the Kunsthistorisches Museum Vienna - maybe including a misidentification?

The identification of Isabella in black is uncertain. Nevertheless, the picture is uncritically circulated as the most famous portrait of Isabella d'Este, e.g. in books, probably because it is a Titian original (and the rest of the colour identifications are only copies).
Isabella d'Este was so famous as 'Prima donna del Mondo' and fashion icon that nobles asked to be allowed to copy her dress. After her death, depictions with balzo were uncritically identified (or marketed) as Isabella. By the end of the last century, all colour identifications were withdrawn due to resulting contradictions. Exceptions are the three portraits in the Kunsthistorisches Museum, which remain contradictory (see graphic at right): Ambras miniature (anonymous 16th century), Isabella in Red (copy by Rubens c. 1606 after a lost original by Titian c. 1524-30), and Isabella in Black (Titian 1536).
Points of discussion in the identification in Isabella in Black are the lack of similarities and the lack of beauty idealisation. At the same time, Isabella's successor Margherita Paleologa shows matching personal characteristics to Isabella in Black (incl. the stiff facial expression). And in 1531 her commission to Titian is also documented.
Leandro Ozzola alternatively published La Bella (in the Palazzo Pitti in Florence) as Titian's portrait resp. idealisation after Francesco Francia.

== See also ==
- List of works by Titian
- Portraits of Isabella d'Este

== Sources ==
- Hickson. Sally "'To see ourselves as others see us': Giovanni Francesco Zaninello of Ferrara and the portrait of Isabella d'Este by Francesco Francia". Renaissance Studies, volume 23, number 3, June 2009, pp. 288-310. JSTOR 24417215
