= House of Gonzaga =

Italian royal family that ruled parts of Northern Italy

- Noble house
- Motto: "Conduct us to the Mount" (Latin: Ad montem duc nos)
- Country: Italy; France
- Founded: 1328; 698 years ago
- Founder: Ludovico I Gonzaga
- Current head: Maurizio Ferrante Gonzaga (of the Vescovato cadet branch)
- Final ruler: Ferdinando Carlo Gonzaga
- Titles: Prince of Arches; Duke of Montferrat; Duke of Mantua; Duke of Guastalla; Duke of Nevers; Duke of Rethel; Duke of Mayenne; Marquis of Mantua; Marquis of Montferrat; County of Novellara and Bagnolo
- Estates: Ducal Palace (Mantua); Ducal Palace (Nevers)
- Deposition: 1708; 318 years ago (Duchy of Mantua)
- Cadet branches: Gonzaga di Vescovato (only remaining branch)

The House of Gonzaga (US: /ɡənˈzɑːɡə, ɡɒn-, -ˈzæɡ-/; Italian: [ɡonˈdzaːɡa]) is an Italian princely family that ruled Mantua in Lombardy, northern Italy from 1328 to 1708 (first as a captaincy-general, then margraviate, and finally duchy). They also ruled Monferrato in Piedmont and Nevers in France, as well as many other lesser fiefs throughout Europe. The family includes a saint, twelve cardinals, and fourteen bishops. Two Gonzaga descendants became empresses of the Holy Roman Empire (Eleonora Gonzaga and Eleonora Gonzaga-Nevers), and one became Queen of Poland and Grand Duchess of Lithuania in the Polish–Lithuanian Commonwealth (Marie Louise Gonzaga).

== History ==
The first members of the family of historical importance are known to have collaborated with the Guelph faction alongside the monks of the Polirone Abbey. Starting from the 12th century they became a dominant family in Mantua, growing in wealth when their allies, the Bonacolsi, defeated the traditional familiar enemy, the Casalodi. In 1328, however, Ludovico I Gonzaga overthrew the Bonacolsi lordship over the city with the help of the Scaliger, and entered the Ghibelline party as capitano del popolo ("people's captain") of Mantua and imperial vicar of Emperor Louis IV.

Ludovico was succeeded by Guido (1360–1369) and Ludovico II (1369–1382), while Feltrino, lord of Reggio until 1371, formed the cadet branch of the Gonzaga of Novellara, whose state existed until 1728. Francesco I (1382–1407) abandoned the traditional alliance with the Visconti of Milan, in order to align their rising power with the Republic of Venice.

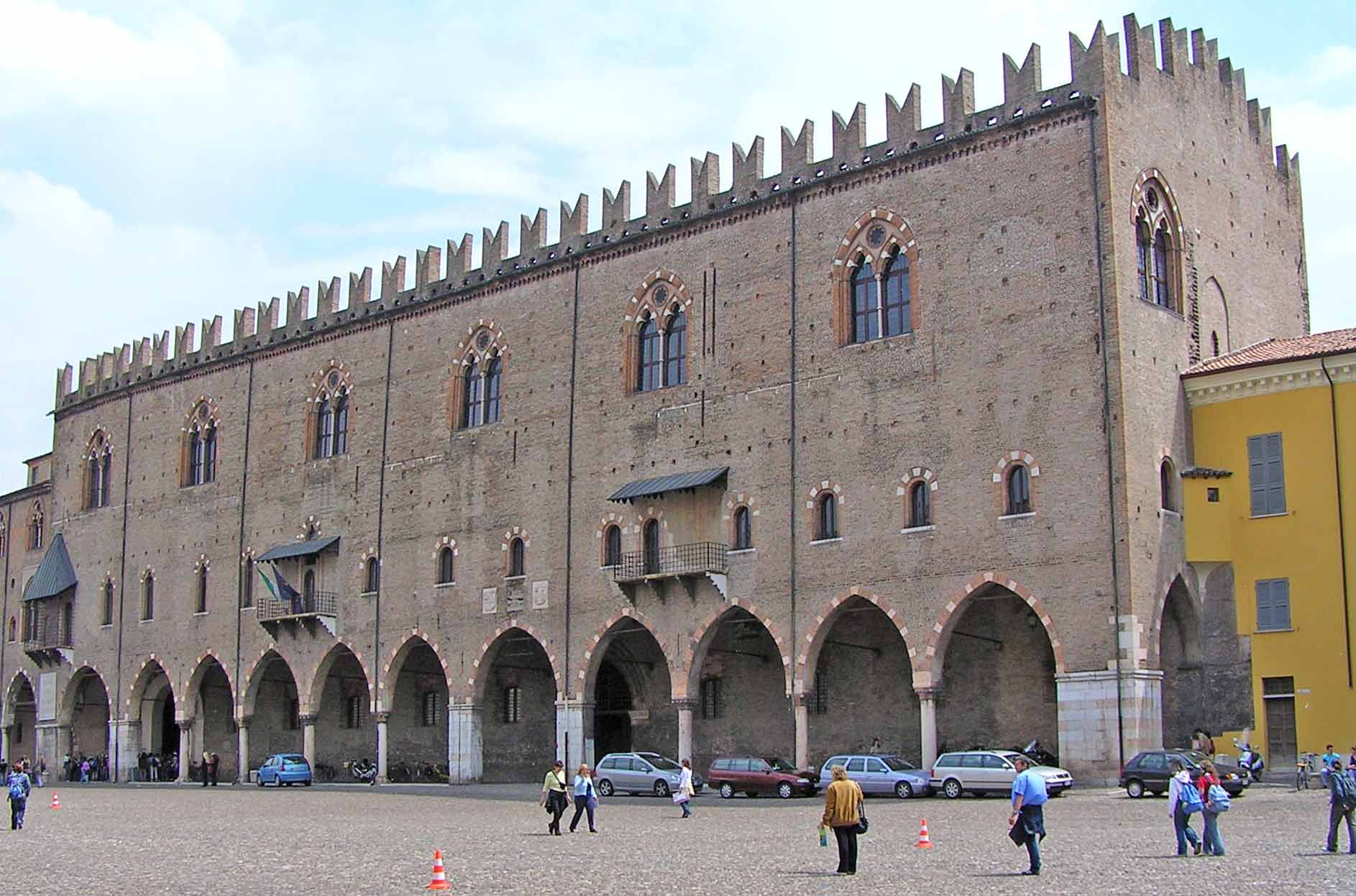
Ducal palace, Mantua.

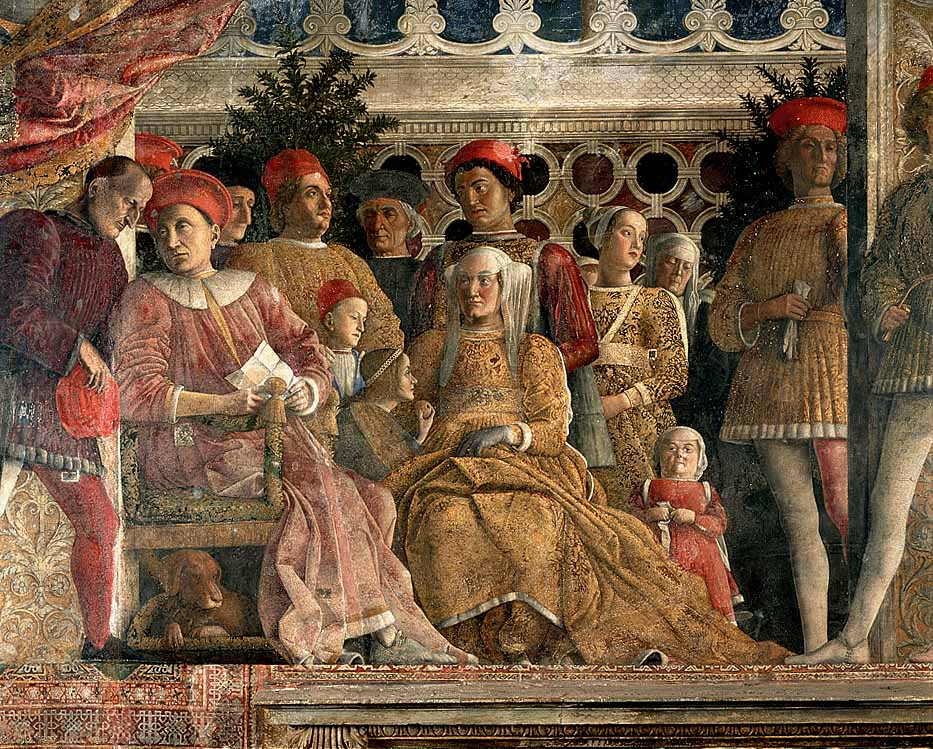
Ludovico III Gonzaga, Marquis of Mantua and Barbara of Brandenburg with their children, fresco by Andrea Mantegna at San Giorgio Castle, Mantua, around 1470.

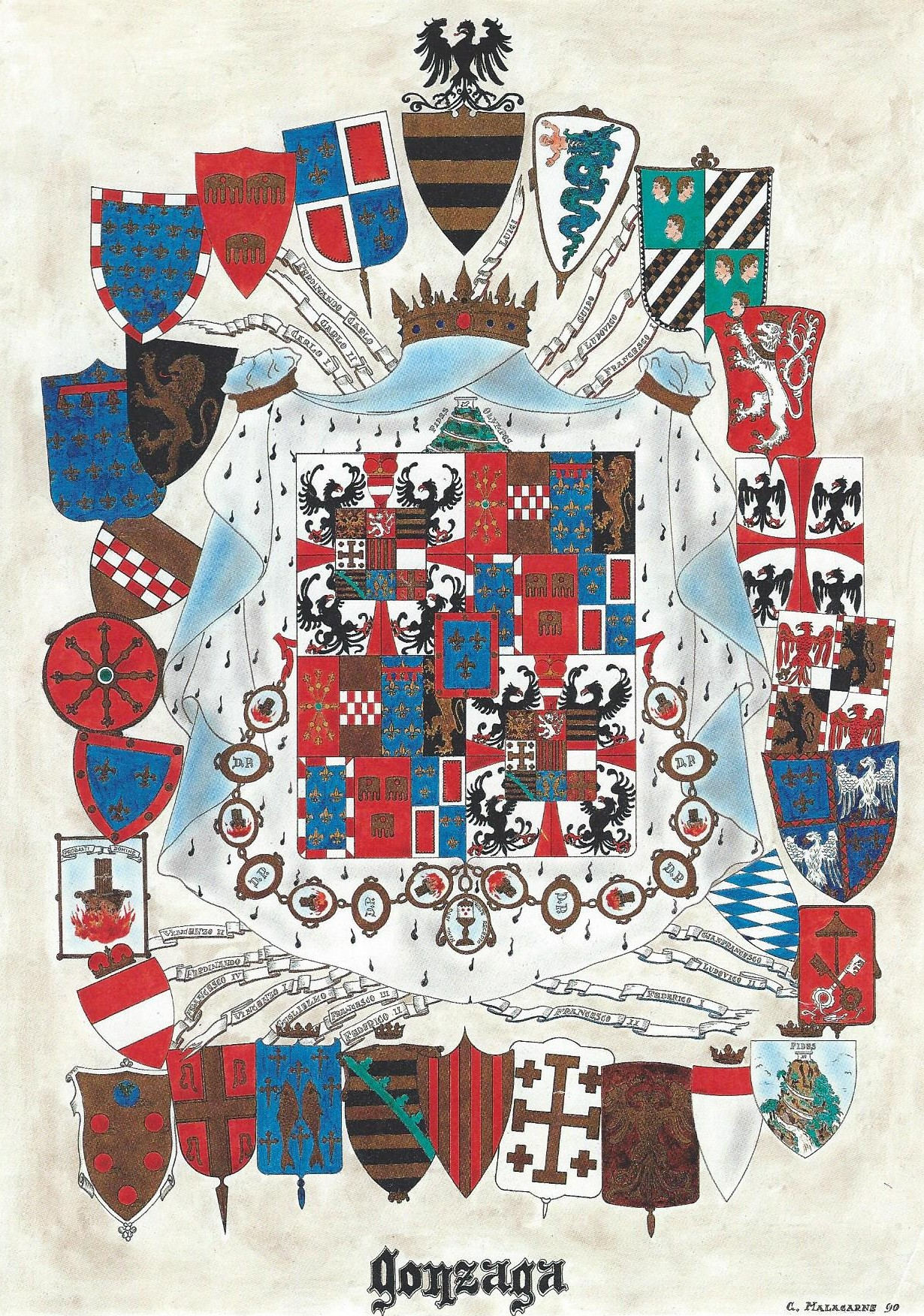
Arms of the Gonzaga-Nevers branch that inherited the Duchy of Mantua from the extinct senior line and ruled it from 1627 to 1708, when that branch died out in the male line.

In 1433, Gianfrancesco I assumed the title of Marquis of Mantua with the recognition of Emperor Sigismund, while obtaining recognition from the local nobility through the marriage of his daughter Margherita to Leonello d'Este, Marquis of Ferrara in 1435. In 1530 Federico II (1500–1540) received the title of Duke of Mantua. Also the two brothers of Federico II are historical characters of a certain importance: Ercole Gonzaga became a cardinal, presided over the Council of Trent and was almost elected Pope; Ferrante was a faithful ally of the Emperor Charles V who covered him with honors and positions, Ferrante was also the progenitor of the cadet branch of the Gonzaga of Guastalla. In 1531, the family acquired the Marquisate of Montferrat through marriage. Through maternal ancestors, the Gonzagas inherited also the Imperial Byzantine ancestry of the Paleologus, an earlier ruling family of Montferrat.

A cadet branch of the Mantua Gonzagas became dukes of Nevers and Rethel in France when Luigi (Louis) Gonzaga, a younger son of Federico II Gonzaga, Duke of Mantua, and Margherita Paleologa, married the heiress. The Gonzaga-Nevers later came to rule Mantua again when Louis's son Charles (Carlo) inherited Mantua and Montferrat, triggering the War of the Mantuan Succession.

Another cadet branch were first sovereign counts, later dukes of Guastalla. They descended from Ferrante, a younger son of Duke Francesco II of Mantua (1484–1519). Ferrante's grandson, Ferrante II, also played a role in the War of the Mantuan Succession. A further cadet branch was that of Sabbioneta, founded by Gianfrancesco, son of Ludovico III.

Marie Louise Gonzaga, daughter of Prince Charles Gonzaga-Nevers, was a queen consort of Poland and grand duchess consort of Lithuania from 1645 to her death in 1667.

Two daughters of the house, both named Eleanor Gonzaga, became Holy Roman Empresses, by marrying emperors Ferdinand II of Germany and Ferdinand III, Holy Roman Emperor, respectively. From the latter Empress Eleonora, the current heirs of the Gonzaga descend.

Saint Aloysius Gonzaga was a member of a junior branch of this family.

The House of Gonzaga is the inspiration for the play-within-the-play in Shakespeare's Hamlet. In Act 3 scene 2, they act out a play called The Murder of Gonzago (or The Mousetrap).

Gonzaga rule continued in Mantua until 1708 and in Guastalla until 1746. Both ruling lines going extinct until passing on to a minor Gonzaga-Vescovato branch, which is the only remaining existing branch.

=== Patronage of the arts ===
The House of Gonzaga was an important patron of the arts. This began when Gianfrancesco Gonzaga funded a school led by Vittorino da Feltre where music and art were core subjects along with mathematics, history, Greek and Latin, religion, and philosophy. The music theorist and composer Franchinus Gaffurius was trained at this school. Isabella d'Este, wife of Francesco II Gonzaga, Marquis of Mantua, used her influence to financially support native composers at court (such as Bartolomeo Tromboncino and Marchetto Cara) which contributed to popularizing the frottola. Cardinal Ercole Gonzaga founded an ecclesiastical chapel which employed musicians and further advance the musical live of the region through sacred music composition and performance.

Guglielmo Gonzaga, Duke of Mantua, himself a gifted composer, founded the Basilica palatina di Santa Barbara (construction began 1562) which became a cultural center for sacred art and music. He also brought several notable composers to the Mantua court, including Alessandro Striggio, Giovanni Giacomo Gastoldi, Giaches de Wert, Benedetto Pallavicino and Claudio Monteverdi. Through Monteverdi, the court witnessed some of the first operas ever staged, including L'Orfeo (1607) and L'Arianna (1608). Marco da Gagliano's La Dafne was staged in 1608.

The Gonzaga House also sponsored theatre. The Mantua court staged Giovanni Battista Guarini's plays Il pastor fido and L'idropica. These plays included incidental music by several different composers, including Monteverdi, Gastoldi, Gagliano, Paolo Birt, and Salamone Rossi. Ferdinando Gonzaga, Duke of Mantua also supported the arts, but financial problems for the court led to a decline in support during his reign.

Ferdinando Carlo Gonzaga, Duke of Mantua and Montferrat employed Antonio Caldara as maestro di cappella from 1701-1707.

== Rulers of the House of Gonzaga ==
=== House of Gonzaga ===
Partitions of Mantua under Gonzaga rule

Lordship of Bagnolo (1399–1509)
Lordship of Mantua (1328–1433) Raised to: Marquisate of Mantua (1433–1530)	Marquisate of Ostiano (1st creation) (1444–1466)	Lordship of Luzzara (1444–1561) (brief reunion with Mantua; 1460–1478) Raised to: Marquisate of Luzzara (1561–1794)
Raised to: Duchy of Mantua (1530–1708) (with Montferrat since 1536)	County of Sabbioneta (1478–1577)	Marquisate of Ostiano (2nd creation) (1478–1495)
Lordship of Bozzolo (1st creation) (1496–1529)	Raised to: Duchy of Sabbioneta (1577–1637)	Lordship of Castiglione (1494–1593) Raised to: Marquisate of Castiglione (1593–1707)
Lordship of Novellara (1360–1501) Raised to: County of Novellara (1501–1737)	Lordship of Vescovato (1519–1559) Raised to: Marquisate of Vescovato (1559–1796)
Lordship of Bozzolo (2nd creation) (1591–1668)	Marquisate of Ostiano (3rd creation) (1591–1703)
Annexed to the Carafa and Guzmán families (1637–1689) Annexed to Spain
County of Guastalla (1539–1621) (purchased from the Torelli family)
Mantua annexed to Austria; Montferrat annexed to Savoy	Annexed to Austria (1703–08)	Annexed to Austria
Raised to: Duchy of Guastalla (1621–1746)	Annexed to Austria
Annexed to the Duchy of Modena
Annexed to the Duchy of Parma
Annexed to Savoy

Table of rulers

Ruler	Born	Reign	Ruling part	Consort	Death	Notes\
Ludovico I	1268; Mantua; Son of Guido Corradi da Gonzaga and Estrambina di San Martino	16 August 1328 – 18 January 1360	Lordship of Mantua	Richilda Ramberti; 1312 four children Caterina Malatesta c.1320 four children Giovanna Malaspina of Fosdinovo; 1340 six children	18 January 1360; Mantua aged 91–92	With the help of Cangrande I della Scala, lord of Verona, Ludovico became Capitano del popolo of Mantua, and also the first effective ruler of his family.
Feltrino	c.1290 Mantua; Third son of Ludovico I and Richilda Ramberti	1335 – 28 December 1374	Lordship of Novellara-Bagnolo	Antonia da Correggio c.1340 four children	28 December 1374; Padua aged 83–84?	Conquered the region of Reggio as early as 1335, and on 17 May 1371 sold to Milan all this land, with the exception of Novellara and Bagnolo.
Guido	1290; Mantua; Second son of Ludovico I and Richilda Ramberti	18 January 1360 – 22 September 1369	Lordship of Mantua	Agnese Pico di Mirandola c.1310/20? two children Camilla Beccaria c.1330? no children Beatrice of Bar; 1340 six children	22 September 1369; Mantua aged 78–79	Elected in Mantua. Got firstly elected in Reggio Emilia in 1335.
Ludovico II	1334; Mantua; Second son of Guido and Beatrice of Bar	22 September 1369 – 4 October 1382	Lordship of Mantua	Alda d'Este; 1356 two children	4 October 1382; Mantua aged 47–48	
Guido II	1 February 1340; Novellara; Second son of Feltrino I and Antonia da Correggio	28 December 1374 – 2 February 1399	Lordship of Novellara	Ginevra Malatesta; 1374 four children	2 February 1399; Novellara aged 59	
Francesco I	1366; Mantua; Son of Ludovico II and Alda d'Este	4 October 1382 – 7 March 1407	Lordship of Mantua	Agnese Visconti; 15 August 1375 (by proxy); 25 December 1380 (formal) one child Margherita Malatesta; 1399 two children	7 March 1407; Cavriana aged 40–41	
Giacomo	c.1375 Novellara; First son of Guido II and Ginevra Malatesta	2 February 1399 – 1441	Lordship of Novellara	Ippolita Pio five children	1441; Novellara aged 64–65	Children of Guido II, divided their inheritance.
Feltrino II	c.1375 Novellara; Second son of Guido II and Ginevra Malatesta	2 February 1399 – 1424	Lordship of Bagnolo	Antonia Gonzaga of Mantua four children	1424 aged 48–49?	Children of Guido II, divided their inheritance.
Regency of Carlo I Malatesta, Lord of Rimini (1407–1409)						On 22 September 1433, the lordship was officially raised to a Marquisate, as Gian Francesco purchased his title from Sigismund, Holy Roman Emperor.
Gian Francesco	1 June 1395; Mantua; Son of Francesco I and Margherita Malatesta	7 March 1407 – 25 September 1444	Lordship of Mantua (1407–1433) Marquisate of Mantua (1433–1444)	Paola Malatesta; 22 August 1409; Pesaro six children	25 September 1444; Mantua aged 49	On 22 September 1433, the lordship was officially raised to a Marquisate, as Gian Francesco purchased his title from Sigismund, Holy Roman Emperor.
Guido I	c.1410? Novellara; Second son of Feltrino II and Antonia Gonzaga of Mantua	1424 – 1456	Lordship of Bagnolo	Unmarried	1456 aged 45–46?	
Francesco I	c.1420 Novellara; First son of Giacomo and Ippolita Pio	1441 – 8 February 1484	Lordship of Novellara	Costanza Strozzi seven children	8 February 1484; Novellara aged 53–54	
Ludovico III the Turk	5 June 1412; Mantua; First son of Gian Francesco and Paola Malatesta	25 September 1444 – 11 June 1478	Marquisate of Mantua	Barbara of Brandenburg; 12 November 1433; Mantua fourteen children	11 June 1478; Goito aged 66	Children of Gian Francesco, divided the land. After Alessandro's death, Ostiano returned to Mantua, only to be partitioned off again in the next generation.
Carlo	1415; Mantua; Second son of Gian Francesco and Paola Malatesta	25 September 1444 – 21 December 1456	Lordship of Luzzara	Lucia d'Este; 1437 no children Ringarda Manfredi two children	21 December 1456; Ferrara aged 40–41	Children of Gian Francesco, divided the land. After Alessandro's death, Ostiano returned to Mantua, only to be partitioned off again in the next generation.
Alessandro	26 August 1427; Mantua; Third son of Gian Francesco and Paola Malatesta	25 September 1444 – 16 January 1466	Marquisate of Ostiano	Agnese da Montefeltro; 1446 no children	16 January 1466; Mantua aged 38	Children of Gian Francesco, divided the land. After Alessandro's death, Ostiano returned to Mantua, only to be partitioned off again in the next generation.
Regency of Ringarda Manfredi (1456–1466)						After his death, Luzzara returned to Mantua, only to be later partitioned off again and given to his cousin Rodolfo.
Ugolotto	1452; Mantua; Son of Carlo and Ringarda Manfredi	21 December 1456 – c.1470	Lordship of Luzzara	Unmarried	c.1470? aged 17–18?	After his death, Luzzara returned to Mantua, only to be later partitioned off again and given to his cousin Rodolfo.
Giorgio	c.1420 Novellara; Second son of Giacomo Gonzaga, Lord of Novellara and Ippolita Pio	1456 – 1487	Lordship of Bagnolo	Paola Schianteschi two or four children Alda Torelli at least four children	1487; Novellara aged 56–57?	
Federico I	25 June 1441; Mantua; Second son of Ludovico III and Barbara of Brandenburg	11 June 1478 – 14 July 1484	Marquisate of Mantua	Margaret of Bavaria; 6 June 1463; Mantua six children	14 July 1484; Mantua aged 43	Children of Ludovico III, divided the land.
Gian Francesco	4 October 1446; Mantua; Fourth son of Ludovico III and Barbara of Brandenburg	11 June 1478 – 27 August 1496	County of Sabbioneta	Antonia del Balzo; 17 July 1479 eleven children	27 August 1496; Bozzolo aged 49	Children of Ludovico III, divided the land.
Rodolfo I	18 April 1452; Mantua; Fifth son of Ludovico III and Barbara of Brandenburg	11 June 1478 – 6 July 1495	Lordship of Luzzara	Antonia Malatesta; 11 January 1481 no children Caterina Pico della Mirandola; 1484 six children	6 July 1495; Fornovo aged 43	Children of Ludovico III, divided the land.
Ludovico	21 August 1460; Mantua; Sixth son of Ludovico III and Barbara of Brandenburg	11 June 1478 – 19 January 1511	Marquisate of Ostiano	Unmarried	19 January 1511; Gazzuolo aged 50	Children of Ludovico III, divided the land.
Ostiano annexed to Sabbioneta
Gian Pietro	1469; Novellara; First son of Francesco I and Costanza Strozzi	8 February 1484 – 18 November 1515	Lordship of Novellara (1484–1501) County of Novellara and Bagnolo (1501–1515)	Caterina Torelli c.1495 eight children	18 November 1515; Novellara aged 45–46	On 7 July 1501, obtained the comital title from Maximilian I, Holy Roman Emperor.
Francesco II	10 August 1466; Mantua; First son of Federico I and Margaret of Bavaria	14 July 1484 – 29 March 1519	Marquisate of Mantua	Isabella d'Este; 11 February 1490 (by proxy); 15 February 1490; Pesaro (formal) eight children	29 March 1519; Mantua aged 52	
Cristoforo	c.1470? First son of Giorgio and Alda Torelli	1487 – 1510	Lordship of Bagnolo (until 1509; at Vescovato since 1494)	Latina Ubaldini three children	After 1510	Children of Giorgio, ruled jointly. Despite losing Bagnolo in 1509 (which merged again in Novellara), they kept rulership at Vescovato which they ruled from 1494. Cristoforo gave up his part in Vescovato in 1510. This feud was then sold in 1519 to Mantua, and given to a collateral line.
Giacomo	c.1470? Second son of Giorgio and Alda Torelli	1487 – 1519	Lordship of Bagnolo (until 1509; at Vescovato since 1494)	Unmarried	After 1519	Children of Giorgio, ruled jointly. Despite losing Bagnolo in 1509 (which merged again in Novellara), they kept rulership at Vescovato which they ruled from 1494. Cristoforo gave up his part in Vescovato in 1510. This feud was then sold in 1519 to Mantua, and given to a collateral line.
Marco Antonio	c.1470? Third son of Giorgio and Alda Torelli	1487 – 1509	Lordship of Bagnolo (until 1509; at Vescovato since 1494)	Unknown four children	1509 aged c.38–39?	Children of Giorgio, ruled jointly. Despite losing Bagnolo in 1509 (which merged again in Novellara), they kept rulership at Vescovato which they ruled from 1494. Cristoforo gave up his part in Vescovato in 1510. This feud was then sold in 1519 to Mantua, and given to a collateral line.
Guido II	c.1470? Fourth son of Giorgio and Alda Torelli	1487 – 1519	Lordship of Bagnolo (until 1509; at Vescovato since 1494)	Laura Martinengo six children	1519 aged 48–49?	Children of Giorgio, ruled jointly. Despite losing Bagnolo in 1509 (which merged again in Novellara), they kept rulership at Vescovato which they ruled from 1494. Cristoforo gave up his part in Vescovato in 1510. This feud was then sold in 1519 to Mantua, and given to a collateral line.
Bagnolo reannexed to Novellara
Regency of Caterina Pico della Mirandola (1495–1502)						Children of Rodolfo, divided officially their inheritance on 30 January 1511. Gian Francesco abdicated to his son shortly before his own death.
Gian Francesco	2 February 1488; Luzzara; First son of Rodolfo I and Caterina Pico della Mirandola	6 July 1495 – 11 October 1524	Lordship of Luzzara	Laura Pallavicino c.1510 eight children	18 December 1524; Luzzara aged 36	Children of Rodolfo, divided officially their inheritance on 30 January 1511. Gian Francesco abdicated to his son shortly before his own death.
Aloisio	20 April 1494; Luzzara; Second son of Rodolfo I and Caterina Pico della Mirandola	6 July 1495 – 19 July 1549	Lordship of Luzzara (until 1511) Lordship of Castiglione (from 1511)	Ginevra Rangoni; 24 July 1519; Mantua no children Caterina Anguissola; December 1540 three children	19 July 1549; Castel Goffredo aged 55	Children of Rodolfo, divided officially their inheritance on 30 January 1511. Gian Francesco abdicated to his son shortly before his own death.
Ludovico	1481; Bozzolo; First son of Gian Francesco and Antonia del Balzo	27 August 1496 – 1 July 1540	County of Sabbioneta	Francesca Fieschi; 1497 eleven children	1 July 1540; Bozzolo aged 58–59	Children of Gian Francesco, divided the land, but given Federico's lack of descendants, the patrimony was inherited by Pirro. After Pirro's death Bozzolo (only) was annexed to Sabbioneta. Gazzuolo lived on until the next generation.
Federico I	c.1480 Bozzolo; Second son of Gian Francesco and Antonia del Balzo	27 August 1496 – 28 December 1527	Lordship of Bozzolo	Giovanna Orsini; 1503; Asola no children	28 December 1527; Todi aged c.46–47	Children of Gian Francesco, divided the land, but given Federico's lack of descendants, the patrimony was inherited by Pirro. After Pirro's death Bozzolo (only) was annexed to Sabbioneta. Gazzuolo lived on until the next generation.
Pirro I	1490; Bozzolo; Third son of Gian Francesco and Antonia del Balzo	27 August 1496 – 22 January 1529	Lordship of Bozzolo (at Gazzuolo 1496–1529; at Bozzolo proper 1527–1529)	Camilla Bentivoglio c.1500? seven children	22 January 1529; Gazzuolo aged 38–39	Children of Gian Francesco, divided the land, but given Federico's lack of descendants, the patrimony was inherited by Pirro. After Pirro's death Bozzolo (only) was annexed to Sabbioneta. Gazzuolo lived on until the next generation.
Bozzolo (only) briefly annexed to Sabbioneta (1529–1591)
Alessandro I	1496; Novellara; First son of Gian Pietro and Caterina Torelli	18 November 1515 – 26 February 1530	County of Novellara and Bagnolo	Costanza da Correggio; 1518 four children	August 1530; Naples aged 33–34	Abdicated shortly before his death.
Regency of Isabella d'Este (1519–1521)						On 8 April 1530, the marquisate was officially raised to a Duchy, as Federico II obtained his title from Charles V, Holy Roman Emperor.
Federico II	17 May 1500; Mantua; First son of Francesco II and Isabella d'Este	29 March 1519 – 28 June 1540	Marquisate of Mantua (1519–1530) Duchy of Mantua (1530–1540)	Margherita Palaiologina of Montferrat; 3 October 1531; Mantua seven children	28 June 1540; Mantua aged 40	On 8 April 1530, the marquisate was officially raised to a Duchy, as Federico II obtained his title from Charles V, Holy Roman Emperor.
Giovanni	1474; Mantua; Third son of Federico I and Margaret of Bavaria	29 March 1519 – 23 September 1525	Lordship of Vescovato	Laura Bentivoglio; 20 June 1491; Bologna eight children	23 September 1525; Mantua aged 50–51	Youngest child of Federico I of Mantua, inherited Vescovato at the same time as his nephew, Federico II was inheriting Mantua.
Regency of Laura Pallavicino (1524–1527)						Fought with his brother Rodolfo, who wanted a condominium in Luzzara. Massimiliano won the war, and his brother eventually got a separate property at Poviglio, given by the Guastalla branch. In 1561 Massimiliano's lordship was elevated to a Marquisate.
Massimiliano	1513; Luzzara; Son of Gian Francesco and Laura Pallavicino	11 October 1524 – 4 March 1578	Lordship of Luzzara (until 1561) Marquisate of Luzzara (from 1561)	Caterina Colonna; 1548 five children	4 March 1578; Luzzara aged 64–65	Fought with his brother Rodolfo, who wanted a condominium in Luzzara. Massimiliano won the war, and his brother eventually got a separate property at Poviglio, given by the Guastalla branch. In 1561 Massimiliano's lordship was elevated to a Marquisate.
Alessandro	1497; Third son of Giovanni and Laura Bentivoglio	23 September 1525 – 17 September 1527	Lordship of Vescovato	Ippolita Sforza one child	17 September 1527; Riozzo aged 29–30	Left a son, but was succeeded by his brother in the lordship.
Sigismondo I	1499; Fifth son of Giovanni and Laura Bentivoglio	17 September 1527 – December 1530	Lordship of Vescovato	Antonia Pallavicino; 1529 two children	December 1530 aged 30–31	
Federico II	c.1520 Gazzuolo (?); First son of Pirro I and Camilla Bentivoglio	22 January 1529 – 1570	Lordship of Bozzolo (at Gazzuolo only)	Lucrezia d'Incisa; 1550 two children.	1570; Gazzuolo aged 49–50	Children of Pirro I. Having lost Bozzolo, got control of the remaining territories. However, after their deaths these territories were also lost.
Carlo	1523; Gazzuolo; Second son of Pirro I and Camilla Bentivoglio	22 January 1529 – 13 June 1555	Lordship of Bozzolo (at San Martino dall'Argine)	Emilia Cauzzi Gonzaga c.1500? seven children	13 June 1555; Gazzuolo aged 32–33	Children of Pirro I. Having lost Bozzolo, got control of the remaining territories. However, after their deaths these territories were also lost.
Gazzuolo and San Martino divided and annexed to Sabbioneta and Mantua
Regency of Costanza da Correggio (1530–1540)						Children of Alessandro I, ruled jointly.
Francesco II	16 January 1519; Novellara; First son of Alessandro I and Costanza da Correggio	26 February 1530 – 1577	County of Novellara and Bagnolo	Caterina Torelli c.1495 eight children	1577; Mantua aged 45–46	Children of Alessandro I, ruled jointly.
Camillo I	27 March 1521; Bologna; Second son of Alessandro I and Costanza da Correggio	26 February 1530 – 24 April 1595	County of Novellara and Bagnolo	Barbara Borromeo (1538 – 1572); 1555 no children	24 April 1595; Novellara aged 74	Children of Alessandro I, ruled jointly.
Alfonso I	25 September 1529; Turin; Fourth son of Alessandro I and Costanza da Correggio	26 February 1530 – 1 October 1589	County of Novellara and Bagnolo	Vittoria di Capua; 1567 thirteen children	1 October 1589; Novellara aged 60	Children of Alessandro I, ruled jointly.
Regency of Antonia Pallavicino (1530–1544)						During his rule the lordship was elevated to a marquisate.
Sigismondo II	1530; Luzzara; Son of Sigismondo I and Antonia Pallavicino	December 1530 – 1567	Lordship of Vescovato (until 1559) Marquisate of Vescovato (from 1559)	Lavinia Rangoni five children	1567 aged 36–37	During his rule the lordship was elevated to a marquisate.
Ferrante I (Ferdinando I)	28 January 1507; Mantua; Third son of Francesco II, Marquis of Mantua and Isabella d'Este	3 October 1539 – 15 November 1557	County of Guastalla	Isabella di Capua; 1530; Naples eleven children	15 November 1557; Brussels aged 50	Guastalla was sold to the Gonzagas in 1539 by Ludovica Torelli.
Regency of Margherita Palaiologina of Montferrat, Cardinal Ercole Gonzaga and Ferrante I, Count of Guastalla (1540–1550)						Left no descendants. He was succeeded by his brother.
Francesco III	10 March 1533; Mantua; First son of Federico II and Margherita Palaiologina of Montferrat	28 June 1540 – 21 February 1550	Duchy of Mantua	Catherine of Austria; 22 October 1549; Mantua no children	21 February 1550; Mantua aged 16	Left no descendants. He was succeeded by his brother.
Regency of Giulia Gonzaga, Countess of Rodigo (1540–1545)						In 1577, the county was elevated to a duchy, obtained from Rudolf II, Holy Roman Emperor.
Vespasiano	6 December 1531; Fondi; Son of Luigi Gonzaga Rodomonte, Heir of Sabbioneta and Isabella Colonna	1 July 1540 – 26 February 1591	County of Sabbioneta (1540–1577) Duchy of Sabbioneta (1577–1591)	Diana Folch de Cardona; April 1550; Piacenza no children Anna of Aragon; 8 May 1564; Madrid three children Margherita Gonzaga of Guastalla; 1581 no children	26 February 1591; Sabbioneta aged 59	In 1577, the county was elevated to a duchy, obtained from Rudolf II, Holy Roman Emperor.
Regencies of Caterina Anguissola (1549–1550) and Giovanni Anguissola (1550–1565)						Children of Aloisio, divided the land.
Alfonso	November 1541; Castel Goffredo; First son of Aloisio and Caterina Anguissola	19 July 1549 – 19 July 1549	Lordship of Castiglione (at Castel Goffredo)	Ippolita Maggi; 1568; Milan seven children	7 May 1593; Gambaredolo aged 51	Children of Aloisio, divided the land.
Ferrante	28 July 1544; Castel Goffredo; Second son of Aloisio and Caterina Anguissola	19 July 1549 – 15 February 1586	Lordship of Castiglione (until 1579; at Castiglione proper) Marquisate of Castiglione (from 1579)	Marta Tana; 15 November 1566 eight children	15 February 1586; Milan aged 41	Children of Aloisio, divided the land.
Orazio	1545; Castel Goffredo; Third son of Aloisio and Caterina Anguissola	19 July 1549 – 13 January 1587	Lordship of Castiglione (at Solferino)	Paola Martinengo; 1568 no children	13 January 1587; Mantua aged 41–42	Children of Aloisio, divided the land.
Castel Goffredo and Solferino merged again in Castiglione
Regency of Margherita Palaiologina of Montferrat, Cardinal Ercole Gonzaga and Ferrante I, Count of Guastalla (1550–1556)						
Guglielmo	24 April 1538; Mantua; Second son of Federico II and Margherita Palaiologina of Montferrat	21 February 1550 – 14 August 1587	Duchy of Mantua	Eleanor of Austria; 26 April 1561; Mantua three children	14 August 1587; Goito aged 49	
Cesare I	6 September 1536; Mantua; Son of Ferrante I and Isabella di Capua	15 November 1557 – 17 February 1575	County of Guastalla	Camilla Borromeo; 12 March 1560 two children	17 February 1575; Guastalla aged 38	
Carlo I	20 April 1551; Vescovato; First son of Sigismondo II and Charlotte de Choiseul	1567 – 9 January 1614	Marquisate of Vescovato	Emilia Olimpia Ferrero Fieschi (d.1630) seven children	9 January 1614; Siena aged 62	
Regency of Camilla Borromeo (1575–1579)						On 2 July 1621 the County was raised to a Duchy. With this new dignity Ferrante claimed for himself (unsuccessfully) the main Duchy of Mantua during the War of Mantuan Succession.
Ferrante II (Ferdinando II)	1563; Guastalla; Son of Cesare I and Camilla Borromeo	17 February 1575 – 5 August 1630	County of Guastalla (1575–1621) Duchy of Guastalla (1621–1630)	Vittoria Doria; 1587 eleven children	5 August 1630; Guastalla aged 66–67	On 2 July 1621 the County was raised to a Duchy. With this new dignity Ferrante claimed for himself (unsuccessfully) the main Duchy of Mantua during the War of Mantuan Succession.
Prospero	1543; Luzzara; Son of Massimiliano and Caterina Colonna	4 March 1578 – 25 September 1614	Marquisate of Luzzara	Isabella Gonzaga of Bozzolo; 1576 thirteen children	25 September 1614; Mantua aged 70–71	Son-in-law of Pirro II of Bozzolo.
Rodolfo II	7 March 1569; Castiglione delle Stiviere; Second son of Ferrante and Marta Tana	15 February 1586 – 3 January 1593	Marquisate of Castiglione	{Elena Aliprandi; 29 October 1588 four children	3 January 1593; Castel Goffredo aged 23	Left no male descendants.
Vincenzo I	21 September 1562; Mantua; Son of Guglielmo and Eleanor of Austria	14 August 1587 – 18 February 1612	Duchy of Mantua	Margherita Farnese; 2 March 1581; Piacenza (annulled 26 May 1583) no children Eleonora de' Medici; 29 April 1584; Mantua six children	18 February 1612; Mantua aged 49	
Isabella	12 January 1565; Sabbioneta; Daughter of Vespasiano and Anna of Aragon	26 February 1591 – 10 February 1637	Duchy of Sabbioneta	Luigi Carafa della Stadera; 29 November 1584; Bozzolo one child	10 February 1637; Naples aged 72	Survived her son; after her death, the duchy was inherited by her granddaughter, Anna Carafa della Stadera, and then to the House of Guzmán.
Sabbioneta inherited by the Carafa family and the House of Guzmán
Pirro II	3 May 1540; San Martino dall'Argine; First son of Carlo and Emilia Cauzzi Gonzaga	1591 – 15 June 1592	Lordship of Bozzolo	Francesca Guerrieri two children	15 June 1592; San Martino dall'Argine aged 52	Possibly for compensation, Bozzolo was returned to this branch after Vespasiano of Sabbioneta's death.
Giulio Cesare	1552; San Martino dall'Argine; Sixth son of Carlo and Emilia Cauzzi Gonzaga	1591 – 23 June 1609	Lordship of Bozzolo	Flaminia Colonna; 1587 two children	23 June 1609; Bozzolo aged 52	Possibly for compensation, Bozzolo was returned to this branch after Vespasiano of Sabbioneta's death.
Francesco	27 April 1577; Castiglione delle Stiviere; Fifth son of Ferrante and Marta Tana	3 January 1593 – 23 October 1616	Marquisate of Castiglione (at Castiglione proper)	Bibiana of Pernstein; 5 February 1598; Prague eight children	23 October 1616; Toscolano-Maderno aged 39	Brothers of Rodolfo II, divided the land once more.
Cristierno	30 September 1580; Castiglione delle Stiviere; Sixth son of Ferrante and Marta Tana	3 January 1593 – September 1630	Marquisate of Castiglione (at Solferino)	Marcella Malaspina of Gragnola; December 1605 three children	September 1630; Solferino aged 49–50	Brothers of Rodolfo II, divided the land once more.
Camillo II	25 May 1581; Novellara; Third son of Alfonso I and Vittoria di Capua	24 April 1595 – 1640 10 September 1644 – 8 November 1650	County of Novellara and Bagnolo	Caterina d'Avalos (1586–1618); 13 January 1605 nine children	8 November 1650; Novellara aged 69	Abdicated to his son, but given his premature death he eventually resumed government.
Francesco Annibale	31 July 1546; Gazzuolo; Third son of Carlo and Emilia Cauzzi Gonzaga	23 June 1609 – 11 March 1620	Marquisate of Ostiano	Unmarried	11 March 1620; Mantua aged 73	Bishop of Mantua, recovered the property of his family at Ostiano. Left no descendants, and Ostiano was inherited by his nephew, the lord of San Martino dell'Argine.
Regency of Isabella Gonzaga of Novellara (1609–1613)						Nephew of Giulio Cesare, Pirro II and Francesco-Annibale. Reunited Bozzolo with Ostiano.
Scipione	1595; San Martino dall'Argine; Son of Ferrante Gonzaga of Bozzolo and Isabella Gonzaga of Novellara	23 June 1609 – 12 May 1670	Lordship of Bozzolo	Maria Mattei (d.1658); 1640 three children	12 May 1670; San Martino dall'Argine aged 74–75	Nephew of Giulio Cesare, Pirro II and Francesco-Annibale. Reunited Bozzolo with Ostiano.
Scipione	1595; San Martino dall'Argine; Son of Ferrante Gonzaga of Bozzolo and Isabella Gonzaga of Novellara	11 March 1620 – 12 May 1670	Marquisate of Ostiano	Maria Mattei (d.1658); 1640 three children	12 May 1670; San Martino dall'Argine aged 74–75	Nephew of Giulio Cesare, Pirro II and Francesco-Annibale. Reunited Bozzolo with Ostiano.
Bozzolo annexed to Ostiano
Francesco IV	7 May 1586; Mantua; First son of Vincenzo I and Eleonora de' Medici	18 February – 22 December 1612	Duchy of Mantua	Margherita of Savoy; 19 February 1608; Turin three children	22 December 1612; Mantua aged 40	After his death his possessions were divided.
Ferdinando	26 April 1587; Mantua; Second son of Vincenzo I and Eleonora de' Medici	22 December 1612 – 29 October 1626	Duchy of Mantua (at Mantua)	Caterina de' Medici; 3 October 1531; Mantua no children	29 October 1626; Mantua aged 39	Brother and daughter of Francesco IV, divided the inheritance.
Regency of Margherita of Savoy (1612–1627)						Brother and daughter of Francesco IV, divided the inheritance.
Maria	29 July 1609; Mantua; Daughter of Francesco IV and Margherita of Savoy	22 December 1612 – 14 August 1660	Duchy of Mantua (at Montferrat)	Carlo Gonzaga, Duke of Nevers; 25 December 1627; Mantua two children	14 August 1660; Porto Mantovano aged 51	Brother and daughter of Francesco IV, divided the inheritance.
Francesco Giovanni	10 April 1593; Vescovato; Son of Carlo I and Emilia Olimpia Ferrero Fieschi	9 January 1614 – 31 August 1636	Marquisate of Vescovato	Camilla Ponzoni (d.1635); 1617 four children Ottavia Cecilia Flameni (d.1640) c.1635 no children	31 August 1636; Vescovato aged 43	
Federico I	20 May 1591; Vicenza; Son of Prospero and Isabella Gonzaga of Bozzolo	25 September 1614 – 3 August 1630	Marquisate of Luzzara	Elisabetta Gonzaga of Poviglio (d.1620) seven children Fulvia di Basilio c.1625? one child	3 August 1630; Treviso aged 39	Son-in-law of Luigi, who was a son of Rodolfo Gonzaga of Poviglio.
Regencies of Cristierno and Cardinal Gian Giacomo Teodoro Trivulzio (1616–1621) and Gridonia Gonzaga (1621–1629)						Left no male descendants. The marquisate passed to his brother.
Luigi	1611; Castiglione delle Stiviere; Second son of Francesco and Bibiana of Pernstein	23 October 1616 – 22 February 1636	Marquisate of Castiglione (at Castiglione proper)	Laura del Bosco Ventimiglia; January 1630; Palermo four children	22 February 1636; Palermo aged 24–25	Left no male descendants. The marquisate passed to his brother.
Vincenzo II	7 January 1594; Mantua; Third son of Vincenzo I and Eleonora de' Medici	29 October 1626 – 25 December 1627	Duchy of Mantua	Isabella Gonzaga of Novellara; 23 August 1616; Mantua no children	25 December 1627; Mantua aged 40	
Carlo I	6 May 1580; Paris; Third son of Ludovico Gonzaga, Duke of Nevers and Henriette of Cleves	25 December 1627 – 22 September 1637	Duchy of Mantua (at Mantua)	Catherine of Mayenne; 1 February 1599; Soissons no children	22 September 1637; Mantua aged 57	Grandson of Federico II, won the War of the Mantuan Succession. From 1627 onwards, the Dukes of Mantua were also Dukes of Nevers, hence the branch name Gonzaga-Nevers.
Luigi I	1602; Luzzara; Second son of Federico I and Elisabetta Gonzaga of Poviglio	3 August 1630 – 3 November 1666	Marquisate of Luzzara	Elena Gonzaga of Vescovato (d.1620) nine children	3 November 1666; Luzzara aged 63–64	
Cesare II	1592; Mantua; First son of Ferrante II and Vittoria Doria	5 August 1630 – 26 February 1632	Duchy of Guastalla	Isabella Orsini (1598–1623); 1612 two children	26 February 1632; Vienna aged 39–40	
Ferrante III (Ferdinando III)	4 April 1618; Mantua; First son of Cesare II and Isabella Orsini	26 February 1632 – 11 January 1678	Duchy of Guastalla	Margherita d'Este; 24 June 1647; Guastalla two children	11 January 1678; Guastalla aged 59	
Guastalla annexed to Milan (1678–1693)
Ferdinando I	7 August 1614; Castiglione delle Stiviere; Third son of Francesco and Bibiana of Pernstein	22 February 1636 – 23 April 1675	Marquisate of Castiglione (at Castiglione proper)	Olimpia Sforza Visconti; December 1644 three children	23 April 1675; Castiglione delle Stiviere aged 60	Left no male descendants. The marquisate went to his cousin, the marquis of Solferino.
Carlo II	2 June 1618; Vescovato; First son of Francesco Giovanni and Camilla Ponzoni	31 August 1636 – 19 September 1695	Marquisate of Vescovato	Unmarried	19 September 1695; Vescovato aged 77	Children of Francesco Giovanni, ruled jointly.
Sigismondo III	11 February 1625; Vescovato; Second son of Francesco Giovanni and Camilla Ponzoni	31 August 1636 – 31 December 1694	Marquisate of Vescovato	Elena Sforza Amigoni; 1673 three children	31 December 1694; Mantua aged 69	Children of Francesco Giovanni, ruled jointly.
Regency of Maria, Duchess of Montferrat (1637–1647)						Grandson of Carlo I. Also Duke of Nevers as Charles III.
Carlo II	31 October 1629; Mantua; Son of Carlo II Gonzaga, Duke of Nevers and Maria, Duchess of Montferrat	22 September 1637 – 14 August 1665	Duchy of Mantua (in Mantua only until 1660; in Mantua and Montferrat from 1660)	Isabella Clara of Austria; 7 November 1649; Mantua one child	14 August 1665; Mantua aged 35 government.	Grandson of Carlo I. Also Duke of Nevers as Charles III.
Alessandro II	1611; Novellara; First son of Camillo IIand Caterina d'Avalos	1640 – 10 September 1644	County of Novellara and Bagnolo	Caterina Torelli c.1495 eight children	10 September 1644; Novellara aged 32–33	His father abdicated for him, but he died four years later, with no descendants; his father returned to government.
Alfonso II	20 April 1616; Novellara; Second son of Camillo IIand Caterina d'Avalos	8 November 1650 – 25 July 1678	County of Novellara and Bagnolo	Ricciarda Cybo-Malaspina; 1648 four children	25 July 1678; Novellara aged 62	
Regency of Isabella Clara of Austria (1665–1671)						Left no descendants. After his death Mantua and Montferrat fell under Austrian control.
Ferdinando Carlo	31 August 1652; Revere; Son of Carlo II and Isabella Clara of Austria	14 August 1665 – 5 July 1708	Duchy of Mantua	Anna Isabella Gonzaga of Guastalla; July 1671; Mantua no children Suzanne Henriette of Lorraine; 8 November 1704; Tortona no children	5 July 1708; Padua aged 55	Left no descendants. After his death Mantua and Montferrat fell under Austrian control.
Mantua-Montferrat annexed to Austria
Federico II	1636; Luzzara; First son of Luigi I and Elena Gonzaga of Vescovato	3 November 1666 – 8 March 1698	Marquisate of Luzzara	Luigia Ludovica Gonzaga of Castiglione (1653–1715); 1667 fourteen children	8 March 1698; Luzzara aged 61–62	
Ferdinando II Filippo	1 December 1643; First son of Scipione and Maria Mattei	12 May 1670 – 1672	Marquisate of Ostiano	Maria Mattei (d.1658); 1640 three children	1672 aged 28–29	
Gian Francesco II	20 February 1646; San Martino dall'Argine; Second son of Scipione and Maria Mattei	1672 – 24 April 1703	Marquisate of Ostiano	Unmarried	24 April 1703; San Martino dall'Argine aged 57	
Ostiano annexed to Mantua (1703–1708) and then to Guastalla
Carlo	3 May 1616; Castiglione delle Stiviere; First son of Cristierno and Marcella Malaspina of Gragnola	September 1630 – 23 April 1675 23 April 1675 – 21 May 1680	Marquisate of Castiglione (at Solferino until 1675; in all Castiglione from 1675)	Isabella Martinengo; 1643 eight children	21 May 1680; Solferino aged 64	From 23 April 1675, reunited once more the marquisates of Solferino and Castiglione.
Camillo III	23 August 1649; Novellara; First son of Alfonso II and Ricciarda Cybo Malaspina	25 July 1678 – 16 August 1727	County of Novellara and Bagnolo	Matilde d'Este c.1495 eight children	16 August 1727; Novellara aged 77	
Ferdinando II	28 August 1648; Solferino; First son of Carlo and Isabella Martinengo	21 May 1680 – 21 January 1707	Marquisate of Castiglione	Laura Pico della Mirandola; 28 February 1680 four children	11 February 1723; Venice aged 74	In 1707, after an attack in Castiglione, he escaped to Venice alongside Ferdinando Carlo Gonzaga of Mantua.
Castiglione annexed to Austria
Vincenzo	18 May 1634; Guastalla; Son of Andrea Gonzaga of San Paolo and Laura Crispiano	1693 – 28 April 1714	Duchy of Guastalla	Teodora Porzia Guidi di Bagno (?–1672) c.1670? no children Maria Vittoria Gonzaga of Guastalla; 1679 five children	28 April 1714; Guastalla aged 79	Grandson of Ferrante II, married Maria Vittoria, daughter of Ferrante III.
Francesco Gaetano	1673; Vescovato; First son of Sigismondo III and Elena Sforza Amigoni	19 September 1695 – 24 July 1735	Marquisate of Vescovato	Anna Goldoni Vidoni (1677–1730); 1696 one child	24 July 1735; Vescovato aged 61–62	
Luigi II	19 September 1679; Luzzara; Second son of Federico II and Caterina Pico della Mirandola	8 March 1698 – 12 June 1738	Marquisate of Luzzara	Charlotte de Choiseul (1679–1734); 1703? seven children	12 June 1738; Luzzara aged 58	
Antonio Ferrante (Antonio Ferdinando)	9 December 1687; Guastalla; First son of Vincenzo and Maria Vittoria Gonzaga of Guastalla	28 April 1714 – 16 April 1729	Duchy of Guastalla	Margherita Cesarini (1695–1725) c.1720? no children Theodora of Hesse-Darmstadt; 29 July 1727; Darmstadt no children	16 April 1729; Guastalla aged 41	
Filippo Alfonso	3/4 December 1700; Novellara; Son of Camillo III and Matilde d'Este	16 August 1727 – 13 December 1728	County of Novellara and Bagnolo	Eleonora Tanara no children	13 December 1728; Massa aged 28	Left no descendants. The county passed to his sister.
Riccarda	22 February 1698; Novellara; Second daughter of Camillo III and Matilde d'Este	13 December 1728 – 12 October 1737	County of Novellara and Bagnolo	Alderano I Cybo-Malaspina; 29 April 1715; Milan three children	24 November 1768; Massa aged 70	Sister of Filippo Alfonso, ruled the county after the extinction of the male line. In 1737, after the War of the Polish Succession, Charles VI, Holy Roman Emperor passed the county to Rinaldo d'Este.
Novellara annexed to Modena
Giuseppe Maria	20 April 1690; Guastalla; Second son of Vincenzo and Maria Vittoria Gonzaga of Guastalla	16 April 1729 – 15 August 1746	Duchy of Guastalla	Eleanor of Schleswig-Holstein-Sonderburg-Wiesenburg; 29 March 1731; Lilienfeld no children	15 August 1746; Padua aged 56	From 1739 until his death, his mental illness caused his wife to assume the reins of the duchy. Left no descendants.
Regency of Eleanor of Schleswig-Holstein-Sonderburg-Wiesenburg (1739–1746)						From 1739 until his death, his mental illness caused his wife to assume the reins of the duchy. Left no descendants.
Guastalla annexed to Parma
Sigismondo IV	1702; Vescovato; Only son of Francesco Gaetano and Anna Goldoni Vidoni	24 July 1735 – 1779	Marquisate of Vescovato	Carlotta Barisoni (1700–1738); 1724 four children	1779; Venice aged 76–77	Left no surviving male offspring. After his death the marquisate was inherited by a distant cousin.
Basilio	26 September 1711; Luzzara; Third son of Luigi II and Charlotte de Choiseul	12 June 1738 – 29 May 1782	Marquisate of Luzzara	Maria Borromeo (d.1761) c.1735? seven children	29 May 1782; Luzzara aged 70	None of the children survived him. He was succeeded by his brother.
Francesco Niccolò	26 December 1731; Vescovato; First son of Francesco Ferrante Gonzaga of Vescovato and Giulia Isolani	1779 – 4 September 1783	Marquisate of Vescovato	Olimpia Scotti; 1756 five children	4 September 1783; Mantua aged 72	Great-great-grandson of Giordano Gonzaga, brother of Carlo I.
Giovanni	4 July 1721; Luzzara; Fifth son of Luigi II and Charlotte de Choiseul	29 May 1782 – 3 April 1794	Marquisate of Luzzara	Teresa Anguissola (1745–1819); 1716 two children	3 April 1794; Mantua aged 72	Left no male descendants. After his death Luzzara was annexed to Savoy.
Luzzara annexed to Savoy
Francesco Luigi	21 October 1763; Vescovato; First son of Francesco Niccolò and Olimpia Scotti	4 September 1783 – 1796	Marquisate of Vescovato	Giulia Cavriani (1767–1846); 1716 two children	17 December 1832; Venice aged 69	In 1796 he was dispossessed of the marquisate, but retained the title.
Vescovato occupied by France

== Family tree ==
The branches of the Gonzaga family, showing marquises and (subsequently) dukes of Mantua in bold, dukes of Nevers and Rethel in italics and the Guastalla line to the right.

Gianfrancesco; Marquis of Mantua; 1407–1444
Ludovico III; Marquis of Mantua; 1444–1478
Federico I Marquis of Mantua; 1478–1484
Francesco II; Marquis of Mantua (1484–1519)
Margaret Paleologa; Marquises of Montferrat	**Federico II**; Marq. (1519–30), Duke (1530–40)	Ercole; Bishop (1521); Cardinal (1527)	Ferrante I Count of Guastalla (1539–1557)
**Francesco III** (1540–1550)	**Guglielmo I** (Guglielmo X in Montferrat) (1550–1587)	Louis of Nevers (1581–1595)	Cesare I Count of Guastalla (1557–1575)
**Vincenzo I** (1587–1612)	Charles III of Nevers a.k.a. **Carlo I** of Mantua (1627–1637)	Ferrante II; 1st. Duke of Guastalla (1575–1630)
**Francesco IV** (1612)	**Ferdinando I** (1612–26)	**Vincenzo II** (1626–27)	Charles of Nevers (1609–1631) m. Maria of Mantua	Cesare II; Duke of Guastalla (1630–1632)	Andrea; Count of San Paolo (d.1686)
Maria of Mantua (1609–1660), m. Charles of Nevers	Carlo II (1637–1665)	Ferrante III; Duke of Guastalla (1632–1678)
Ferdinando Carlo (1665–1708)	Anna Isabella (1678–1692)	Maria Vittoria (1659–1707)	Vincenzo; Duke of Guastalla (1692–1714)
Eleonora Luisa (1686–1741) m. Francesco de' Medici	Antonio Ferrante; Duke of Guastalla (1714–1729)	Giuseppe; Duke of Guastalla (1729–1746)

== Prominent Clerics ==
- Aloysius Gonzaga, SJ 1568–1591, canonized by the Catholic Church in 1726

== Roman Catholic cardinals ==
Cardina	Name
	Francesco Gonzaga (1444–1483)
	Sigismondo Gonzaga
	Ercole Gonzaga
	Pirro Gonzaga
	Francesco Gonzaga
	Federico Gonzaga
	Gianvincenzo Gonzaga
	Scipione Gonzaga
	Ferdinando Gonzaga
	Vincenzo Gonzaga

== See also ==
- Duchy of Mantua, a list of House of Gonzaga rulers
- Duchy of Guastalla
- Duchy of Sabbioneta
- County of Novellara and Bagnolo

== Bibliography ==
- Brinton, Selwyn (1927). The Gonzaga. Lords of Mantua. London: Methuen.
- Simon, Kate (1988). A Renaissance Tapestry: The Gonzaga of Mantua. New York: Harper & Row. ISBN 978-0-060-15847-7.
