= Ludovico Gonzaga (1480–1540) =

Italian nobleman

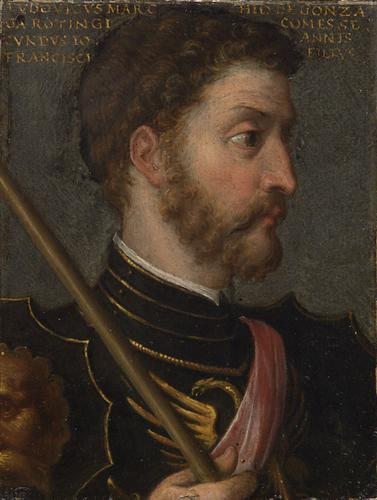
Portrait of Ludovico Gonzaga by anonymous.

Ludovico Gonzaga (1481 - June 1540) was an Italian nobleman and condottiero, a member of the House of Gonzaga branch of Sabbioneta.

== Biography ==
He was born at Bozzolo, the son of Gianfrancesco Gonzaga and Antonia del Balzo. At his father's death, he received parts of the family lands including Rodigo and, together with his brother Pirro, Gazzuolo, Sabbioneta, Pomponesco and Dosolo. The other two sons, Federico (1484-1527) and Gianfrancesco (who died in his youth), received Bozzolo, Rivarolo and Isola Dovarese, while San Martino was to be shared among all the brothers.

Ludovico was sent by his father at the court of king Charles VIII of France; later, he received by emperor Maximilian I the right to mint coins at Sabbioneta and Bozzolo. In 1509 he took part in the Siege of Padua. One year later he defended Verona and obtained the title of governor of that city. In 1511, at the death of his uncle Ludovico Gonzaga, bishop of Mantua, he received the fiefs of Ostiano and Castel Goffredo, causing some strife with his relatives of the main Gonzaga branch of Mantua. In 1515 he was hired as commander by Pope Leo X and one year later he was under Francesco II Gonzaga of Mantua. In 1517 he bought, for 20,000 ducats, the fief of Casalmaggiore, but after a siege he was forced to surrender it to the Sforza.

Ludovico Gonzaga lived most of the time in Sabbioneta, which he had received by Pirro, together with his wife Francesca Fieschi and the family. Their children include: Louis (Rodomonte) (1500-1532), Gianfrancesco "Cagnino" (1502-1529), both military leaders; Pirro (1505-1529), a Roman Catholic cardinal; Giulia (1513-1566), wife of Vespasiano Colonna; Ippolita (died 1571), bride of Galeotto II Pico della Mirandola; and Paola (died 1550), who married Gian Galeazzo Sanvitale. Since no son survived him, at Ludovico's death his lands went to Vespasiano I Gonzaga, Louis' eldest son.

== Sources ==
- Ventura, Leandro (2008). I Gonzaga delle nebbie: storia di una dinastia cadetta nelle terre tra Oglio e Po. Silvana.
