= Luigi Gonzaga =

Luigi Gonzaga may refer to several members of the House of Gonzaga:

- Aloisio Gonzaga (1494-1549), condottiero
- Louis Gonzaga (Rodomonte) (1500-1532), condottiero, nicknamed "Rodomonte"
- Louis Gonzaga, Duke of Nevers (1539-1595), half-French politician
- Aloysius Gonzaga (1568-1591), Jesuit saint, grandson of Aloisio
