= Lucrezia Gonzaga =

Italian noblewoman

Lucrezia Gonzaga di Gazzuolo (1522 – 11 February 1576) was an Italian noblewoman known for her literary talents, and her association with Matteo Bandello. Bandello taught her mathematics, astronomy, rhetoric and logic, and wrote poetry in her honour, during his stay in Castel Goffredo at the court of Luigi Gonzaga. A volume of her letters was published in Venice in 1552; some scholars believe Ortensio Lando was the author and not just the editor, though this has been disputed.

She was born in Bozzolo to Pirro Gonzaga, lord of Gazzuolo, member of a secondary branch of the Gonzaga family, and Camilla Bentivoglio. At the age of 14 she married Paolo Manfrone, and is sometimes known as Lucrezia Gonzaga Manfrona. She died in 1576 in Mantua.

== Works ==
- Lettere della molto illustre sig. la s.ra donna Lucretia Gonzaga da Gazuolo con gran diligentia raccolte, & a gloria del sesso feminile nuouamente in luce poste. Venice, 1552 (Collected by Ortensio Lando?)
- Lucrezia Gonzaga, Lettere. Vita quotidiana e sensibilità religiosa nel Polesine di metà ‘500, a cura di Renzo Bragantini e Primo Griguolo, Minelliana, Rovigo, 2009.

== Sources ==
- Ginevra Canonici Fachini, Prospetto biografico delle donne italiane rinomate in letteratura, 1824
- Mary Hays, Female Biography; or Memoirs of Illustrious and Celebrated Women of all Ages and Countries (volume 4), 1803
- Giuseppe Maffei, Storia della letteratura italiana, 1834
