= Aloisio Gonzaga =

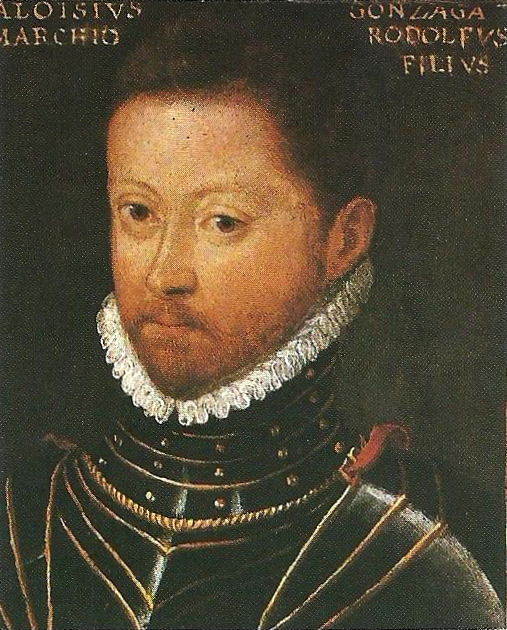
- Portrait of Aoisio Gonzaga, unknown 16th century artist, Ambras Collection, Kunsthistorisches Museum, Vienna

Marquis of Castel Goffredo, Castiglione, Solferino
- Reign: 1511–1549
- Predecessor: Ludovico Gonzaga (bishop of Mantua)
- Successor: Alfonso Gonzaga
- Born: 20 April 1494; Luzzara
- Died: 19 July 1549 (aged 55); Castel Goffredo
- Spouse: Ginevra Rangoni, Caterina Anguissola
- Issue: Alfonso Gonzaga; Ferrante Gonzaga; Orazio Gonzaga
- House: Gonzaga
- Father: Rodolfo Gonzaga
- Mother: Caterina Pico

Aloisio Gonzaga (20 April 1494 – 19 July 1549) was an Italian feudal lord and condottiero.

== Early life ==
Baptized with the name of Alessandro, he was usually known since his time by that of Luigi (in Latin Aloysius), also in its variants of Aloisio, Aluigi, Alvise and Loysio; in his correspondence examined by Guido Sommi Picenardi, he used to sign himself "Luis de Gonzaga". In later historiography he is generally referred to as 'Luigi Alessandro Gonzaga'. He was the sixth child and second son of another lord and condottiero, Rodolfo Gonzaga and his wife Caterina Pico.

== Biography ==
The lord of Castel Goffredo, Castiglione and Solferino, he was the founder of two cadet branches of the House of Gonzaga known as the "Castel Goffredo, Castiglione and Solferino Gonzagas" and "Castel Goffredo Gonzagas"; both branches went extinct in 1593. He backed the Holy Roman Empire and its leader Charles V; Charles visited him at his residence in 1543.

He was one of the most important figures in the history of Castel Goffredo. He made it the capital of his small state, consisting of the imperial fiefdoms of Castel Goffredo, Castiglione, and Solferino, and produced most of its town planning.

Upon his death, the three fiefdoms were divided between his three sons, Alfonso, Ferrante, and Orazio.

== Personal life ==
He was married to Caterina Anguissola and had three sons:

- Alfonso (1541–1592), third Lord of Castel Goffredo; married in 1568 to Ippolita Maggi.
  - Caterina di Gonzaga-Castelgoffredo; married Carlo Emanuele Teodore Trivulzio, Conte di Melzo (d. 1605).
    - Ippolita Trivulzio; married Honoré II, Prince of Monaco.
- Ferrante (1544–1586), first Marquis of Castiglione; married Marta Tana di Santena da Chieri (1550-1605); had issue, including:
  - Saint Aloysius de Gonzaga, deceased in 1591;
  - Rodolfo Gonzaga (1569-1593), instigator of the assassination of his uncle Alfonso (cf above), he was likewise assassinated the following year.
- Orazio (1545–1587), third Lord of Solferino.

== Bibliography ==
- (in Italian) Costante Berselli, Castelgoffredo nella storia, Mantova, 1978.
- (in Italian) Francesco Bonfiglio, Notizie storiche di Castelgoffredo, 2ª ed., Mantova, 2005, ISBN 88-7495-163-9.
- (in Italian) Carlo Gozzi, Raccolta di documenti per la storia patria od Effemeridi storiche patrie, Tomo II, Mantova, 2003, ISBN 88-7495-059-4.
- (in Italian) Massimo Marocchi, I Gonzaga di Castiglione delle Stiviere. Vicende pubbliche e private del casato di San Luigi, Verona, 1990.
- (in Italian) Piero Gualtierotti, Castel Goffredo dalle origini ai Gonzaga, 2008, Mantova.
- (in Italian) Giovanni Scardovelli, Luigi, Alfonso e Rodolfo Gonzaga marchesi di Castelgoffredo, Bologna, 1890.
- Sommi Picenardi, Guido (1864). Castel Goffredo e i Gonzaga (in Italian). Milano: Tipolitografia Lombardi. ICCU LO10148459.
- Tamalio, Raffaele (2001). "GONZAGA, Luigi". Dizionario Biografico degli Italiani (in Italian). Rome: Treccani.
- (in Italian) Massimo Telò, Aloisio Gonzaga. Un principe nella Castel Goffredo del '500, Roma, 2021.
