= Giulia Gonzaga =

Italian countess and letter writer (1513–1566)

- Countess of Fondi, Duchess of Traetto
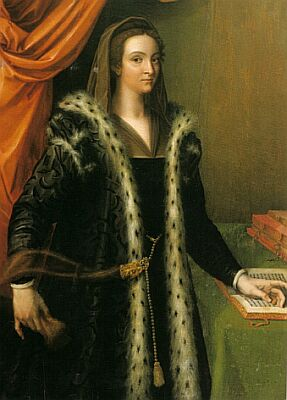
- Giulia Gonzaga in 1535, mourning
- Born: 1513; Gazzuolo, present-day Italy
- Died: 16 April 1566 (aged 52–53); Rome, Papal States (present-day Italy)
- Noble family: Gonzaga
- Spouse: Vespasiano Colonna
- Father: Ludovico Gonzaga
- Mother: Francesca Fieschi
- Occupation: Poet

Giulia Gonzaga (1513 – 16 April 1566) was an Italian countess and letter writer of the Renaissance. She was the countess regnant of Rodigo as the heir of her late spouse between 1528 and 1541.

== Biography ==
Giulia was born in Gazzuolo (near Mantua) in 1512 the daughter of Ludovico Gonzaga, lord of Sabbioneta and Bozzolo, and Countess Francesca Fieschi.

In 1526 (at age 14) she was married to Count Vespasiano Colonna (1480–1528), count of Fondi and duke of Traetto (present-day Minturno). In 1528 her husband died, leaving the County of Rodigo to her upon the condition that she not remarry. Giulia organized her palace as a center of culture, attracting the attention of many of her contemporaries as much for these activities as for her famous beauty, though she refused to marry again. She had a liaison with Cardinal Ippolito de' Medici of Florence, who died in Itri (southern Lazio) after a meeting with her.

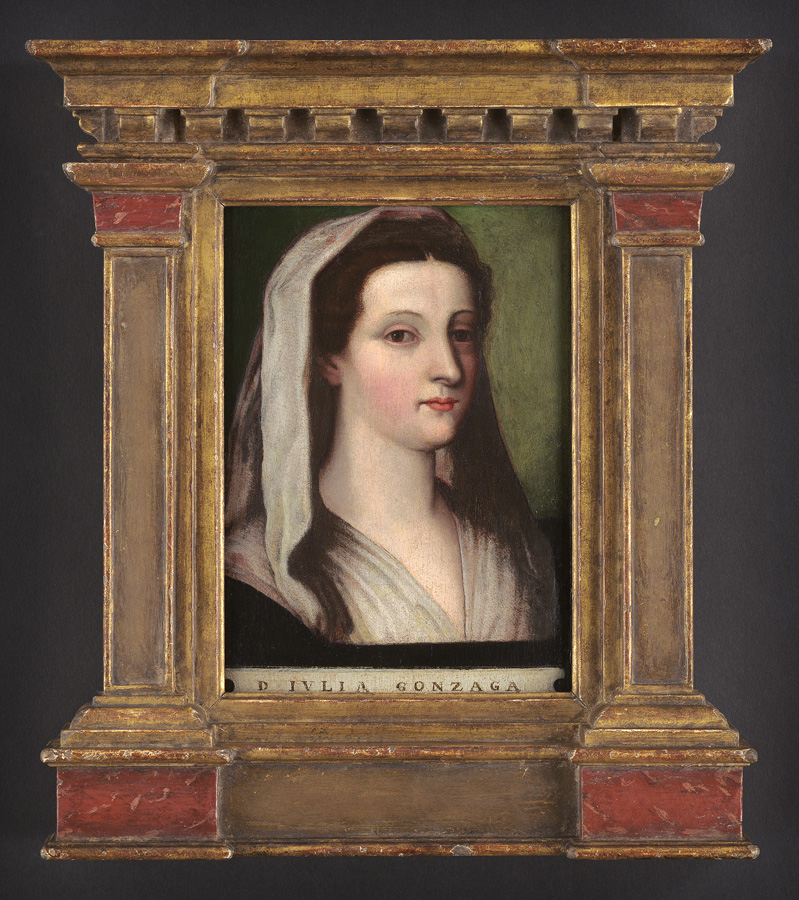
Giulia Gonzaga

In the night of 8–9 August 1534, the town of Fondi was attacked by the corsair Barbarossa, who was seeking to kidnap and deliver her to Suleiman the Magnificent. Barbarossa had been ordered to kidnap (enslave) her by Ibrahim Pasha, the Ottoman Grand Vizier. Pasha's plan was to add her to the sultan's Ottoman Imperial Harem (as a slave concubine) and supplant Roxelana, the sultan's wife. She escaped, and Barbarossa, frustrated, massacred the populations of Fondi and nearby Sperlonga, though he was repulsed at nearby Itri. She fled into the night, accompanied by a single knight. James Reston alleges that Gonzaga later had the knight killed because she had been nearly nude during her escape, and he had seen too much, though he provides no reference for this claim. There is also speculation that Barbarossa's attempt may have been motivated by members of the Colonna family wishing to recover their lands after Vespasiano Colonna's death.

Giulia Gonzaga joined a convent in Naples in 1535 (at age 22); she did not become a nun, but lived in the convent as a laywoman and kept her domain as countess of Rodigo. In the convent she met Juan de Valdés in 1536. This encounter and subsequent correspondence brought her to the attention of the Inquisition, for example leading her to write a letter in 1553 to cardinal Ercole Gonzaga to express her lack of agreement with the later writings of de Valdés.

In 1541, she left her fief to her nephew Vespasiano I Gonzaga.

Giulia Gonzaga died at age 53 in 1566. After her death, her correspondence with Pietro Carnesecchi led to the latter's being burned at the stake for heresy (in 1567).

== See also ==
- Turkish Slave

== Sources ==
- Camilla Russell, Giulia Gonzaga and the Religious Controversies of Sixteenth-century Italy Brepols, 2006, ISBN 9782503518077
- Christopher Hare; Marian Andrews (1912). A Princess of the Italian Reformation: Giulia Gonzaga, 1513-1566, Her Family and Her Friends. C. Scribner's sons.
- Julie D. Campbell; Anne R. Larsen (2009). "Women, Letters, and Heresy in Sixteenth Century Italy". Early Modern Women and Transnational Communities of Letters. Ashgate Publishing, Ltd. pp. 75–. ISBN 978-0-7546-6738-4.
- Diana Maury Robin; Anne R. Larsen; Carole Levin (2007). Encyclopedia of Women in the Renaissance: Italy, France, and England. ABC-CLIO. pp. 166–. ISBN 978-1-85109-772-2.<
