= Gianfrancesco Gonzaga (1446–1496) =

Italian noble

- Count of Sabbioneta
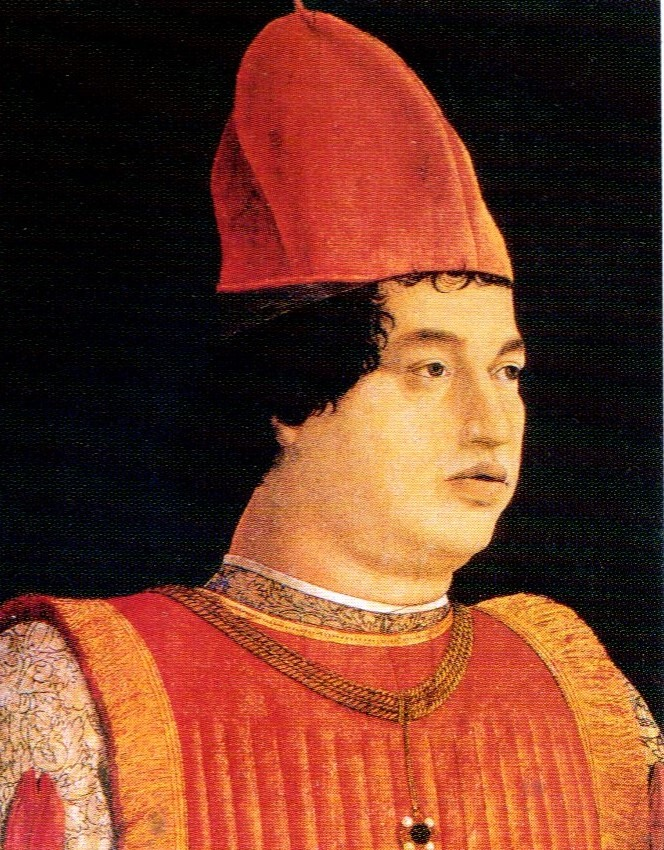
- Born: Mantua
- Died: Bozzolo
- Noble family: House of Gonzaga
- Spouse: Antonia del Balzo
- Issue: Pirro Gonzaga; Ludovico Gonzaga (1480–1540)
- Father: Ludovico III Gonzaga, Marquis of Mantua
- Mother: Barbara of Brandenburg

Gianfrancesco Gonzaga (1446 – 28 August 1496) was the third son of Ludovico III Gonzaga, Marquess of Mantua and Barbara of Brandenburg. He was the first Count of Sabbioneta from 1479 until his death, originating the later Princely Gonzaga-Sabbioneta, Gonzaga-Bozzolo, Gonzaga-Gazzuolo and Gonzaga-San Martino lines of the Gonzaga family.

== Biography ==
He was born in Mantua.

in 1478, when his father Ludovico died, the Gonzaga lands between the Po and Oglio rivers were inherited by his sons cardinal Francesco and Gianfrancesco. When Francesco died, the latter became the only lord, adding to them the county of Rodigo.

Gianfrancesco chose Gazzuolo as the seat of his court. The town was fortified and later became the seat of a marquisate (1565). He married Antonia Del Balzo, daughter of Pietro Del Balzo, duke of Andria.

He died at Bozzolo in 1496. His lands were inherited by his sons Pirro and Ludovico.
