= Louis Gonzaga =

Louis Gonzaga may refer to:

- Louis Gonzaga, Duke of Nevers (1539–1595), Italian-French dignitary and diplomat
- Louis Gonzaga (Rodomonte) (1500–1532), Imperial mercenary captain for Emperor Charles V
