= Pirro Gonzaga =

Italian nobleman and condottiero (1490–1529)

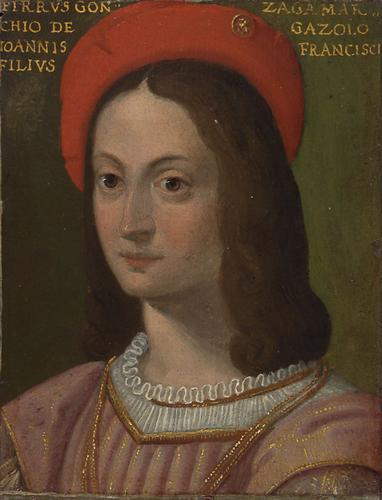
Portrait of Pirro Gonzaga.

Pirro Gonzaga (1490 – 22 January 1529) was an Italian nobleman and condottiero during the Italian Wars of 1494–1559. He was accused of treason against the Holy Roman Empire, sided with France, and was eventually defeated and imprisoned in Lombardy.

== History ==
Pirro Gonzaga was the second child of Gianfrancesco Gonzaga and Antonia Del Balzo. In 1499, after his father's death, he shared the inheritance of Sabbioneta, Dosolo, Pomponesco, Gazzuolo and Rodigo with his brother Ludovico. In 1521 he sold the area of Sabbioneta to Ludovico.

In 1522 he participated in the conquest of Perugia. Taken as prisoner and accused of treason, in 1523 he lost his fiefs, which were assigned by the emperor Charles V to his nephew Luigi Gonzaga.

In 1524 he was defeated at the siege of Pavia. He later abandoned the imperial allegiance and sided with the French, until he was defeated by Fernando Francesco d'Avalos at the battle of Sant'Angelo Lodigiano. He surrendered and was imprisoned in the tower of Pizzighettone. Ransomed by his mother Antonia, he subsequently retired to Gazzuolo, where he died in 1529.

His daughter Lucrezia was a member of the literati.
