= Scipione Gonzaga =

Italian cardinal

- Cardinal, Titular Patriarch of Jerusalem
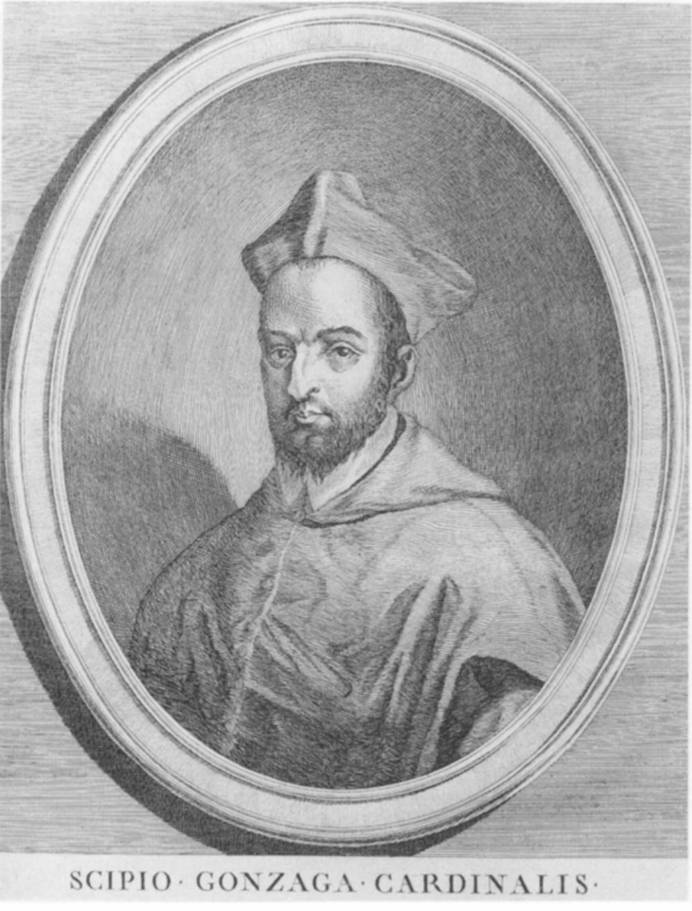
- Church: Catholic Church
- See: Latin Patriarchate of Jerusalem
- Appointed: 23 September 1585
- Term ended: 11 January 1593
- Predecessor: Gian Antonio Facchinetti
- Successor: Fabio Blondus de Montealto

Orders
- Consecration: 4 October 1585 (Bishop) by Iñigo Avalos de Aragón
- Created cardinal: 11 December 1587 by Pope Sixtus V

Personal details
- Born: 11 November 1542 San Martino dall'Argine
- Died: 11 January 1593 (aged 50) San Martino dall'Argine
- Buried: Church of Santi Fabiano e Sebastiano, San Martino dall'Argine

Scipione Gonzaga (1542 – 1593) was an Italian cardinal, chiefly remembered for his friendship and patronage of the troubled poet Torquato Tasso and his support, against other family members, for his cousin Saint Aloysius Gonzaga.

== Life ==
Born on 11 November 1542 in San Martino dall'Argine (or in Mantua according to other sources), he belonged to the family of the Dukes of Sabbioneta, his father Carlo being the Marquess of Gazzuolo. Second-born, he was destinated since his childhood to the ecclesiastic life. He passed his youth under the care of Cardinal Ercole Gonzaga, and made rapid progress in Greek and Latin studies. At Bologna, and later at Padua, he studied mathematics and philosophy, and, in the latter city, founded the Accademia degli Eterei, or Academy of the Ethereals. Throughout his life he patronized literature and men of letters, among the latter being Tasso, who sought his advice concerning his Gerusalemme Liberata, and Guarini, who dedicated to him his Il pastor fido. Gonzaga's home in Rome, the Palazzo Aragona Gonzaga, was a meeting place for the most eminent musicians and intellectuals of the day.

Having finished his theological studies he went to Rome, became cameriere segreto to Pope Pius IV, and was ordained priest on 1 November 1579. In the early years of the reign of Pope Gregory XIII Gonzaga had a serious lawsuit with the Duke of Mantua over some property, but they were soon reconciled. Through the Guise party, whose cause he had aided, he became Bishop of Mende in France, but Charles, Duke of Guise pleaded unsuccessfully with Gregory XIII to have him made cardinal.

Pope Sixtus V, immediately on his elevation, appointed him Latin Patriarch of Jerusalem and on 4 October 1585 he was consecrated bishop by Iñigo Avalos de Aragón, with Enrico Caetani and Annibale de Capua serving as co-consecrators. On 18 December 1587, at the request of the Duke of Mantua, raised him to the cardinalate with the title of cardinal priest of Santa Maria del Popolo. Sixtus also made constant use of his services in the execution of his policies, domestic and foreign.

Cardinal Gonzaga was a friend of Charles Borromeo and Philip Neri, and his cousin Aloysius Gonzaga owed him eventual consent of his father to his entering the Society of Jesus. For a time Gonzaga was Governor of the March of Montferrat, in the name of the Marquess Vincenzo.

He died on 11 January 1593 in San Martino dall'Argine, and was buried in the church of Santi Fabiano e Sebastiano in that town.

== Works ==
The three books of his Commentarii, an autobiography written in polished Latin, are an important source of information for the history of his cardinalate; they were edited at Rome in 1791.

== Episcopal succession ==
Episcopal succession of Scipione Gonzaga

While bishop, he was the principal consecrator of:

- Marcantonio Bizzoni, Bishop of Foligno (1586);
- Sebastian Breuning, Titular Bishop of Adramyttium and Auxiliary Bishop of Augsburg (1587);
- Francesco Panigarola, Titular Bishop of Chrysopolis in Arabia and Auxiliary Bishop of Ferrara (1588);
- Fabio Biondi, Titular Patriarch of Jerusalem (1588);
- Camilli Caetani, Titular Patriarch of Alexandria (1588);
- Gerolamo Vela, Bishop of Larino (1591);
- Ludovico Alferio, Bishop of San Marco (1591); and

the principal co-consecrator of:

- Cristóbal Senmanat y Robuster, Bishop of Orihuela (1587); and
- Fulvio Teofili, Bishop of Forlì (1587).

He also ordained Francesco Maria Bourbon Del Monte Santa Maria (1589) to the priesthood.
