= Gianfrancesco Gonzaga =

Gianfrancesco Gonzaga may refer to:

- Gianfrancesco I Gonzaga, Marquis of Mantua (1395–1444)
- Gianfrancesco Gonzaga (1446–1496), condottiero
- Gianfrancesco Gonzaga (1488–1524), lord of Luzzara
- Gianfrancesco Gonzaga (1502–1539), soldier, called Cagnino
- Gianfrancesco Gonzaga (theologian) (16th century)
- Gianfrancesco Gonzaga di Novellara (died 1630), diplomat
- Gianfrancesco II Gonzaga (1646–1703), prince of Bozzolo
- Gianfrancesco Gonzaga (1674–1720), soldier
