= Ferrante Gonzaga, Marquess of Castiglione =

Italian nobleman and condottiero

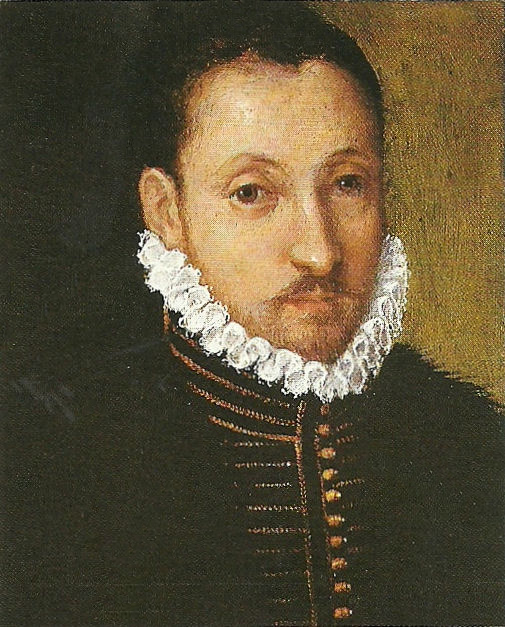

Ferrante or Ferdinando Gonzaga, first marquess of Castiglione (28 July 1544 – 13 February 1586) was an Italian nobleman and condottiero.

== Life ==
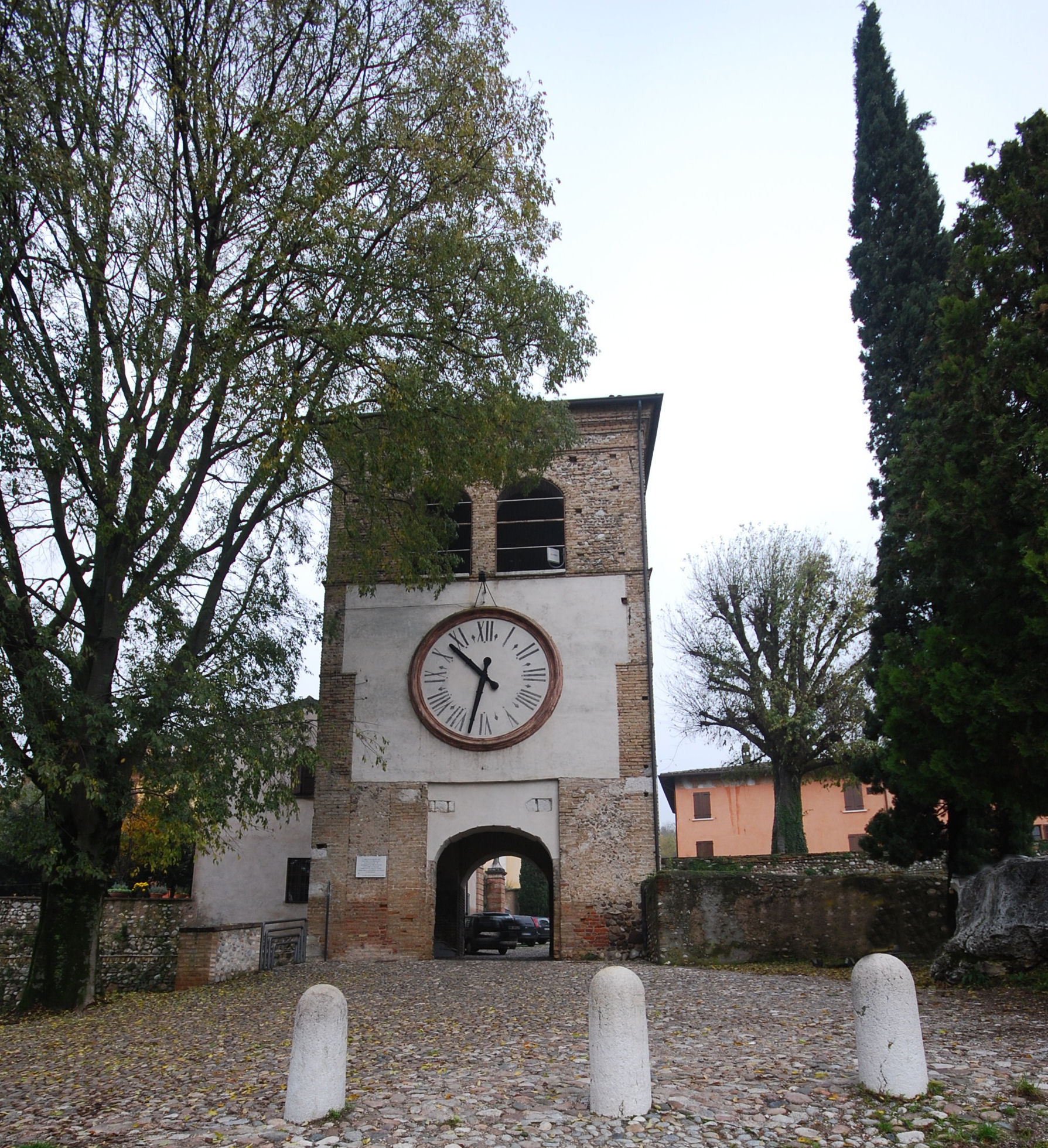
Castle at Castiglione delle Stiviere.

Born in Castel Goffredo, he was the second son of Aloisio Gonzaga and Caterina Anguissola. On his father's death he inherited the fiefdom of Castiglione and on 20 March 1559 was invested with it by Ferdinand I through nuncio Alessandro Pomello, in an imperial document which also invested Orazio with Solferino and Alfonso with Castel Goffredo. In the same year Ferrante went to Spain, where he spent several years of his life, to complete his education. In 1561 he returned to Castiglione. In 1565 he was in Vienna to plead with the emperor about the Gonzaga possessions in Monferrato.

In 1566 he was back in Spain, where he fell in love with lady Marta Tana di Santena of Chieri, daughter of baron Baldassare and Anna Della Rovere and on 15 November he married her before moving back to Castiglione with her. They had eight children, the first of whom, Luigi, was born on 9 March 1568. He returned to Spain again in 1570 for the war against the Moors in Granada and remained there until 1571, when Maximilian II made him a marquess, and he prepared to expand his residence. In 1577, to avoid the plague infecting Castiglione, he and his family travelled to Monferrato, where an attack of gout forced him to spend long periods on medical treatment. In 1579 he was in Venice to settle a question about the borders between the two states.

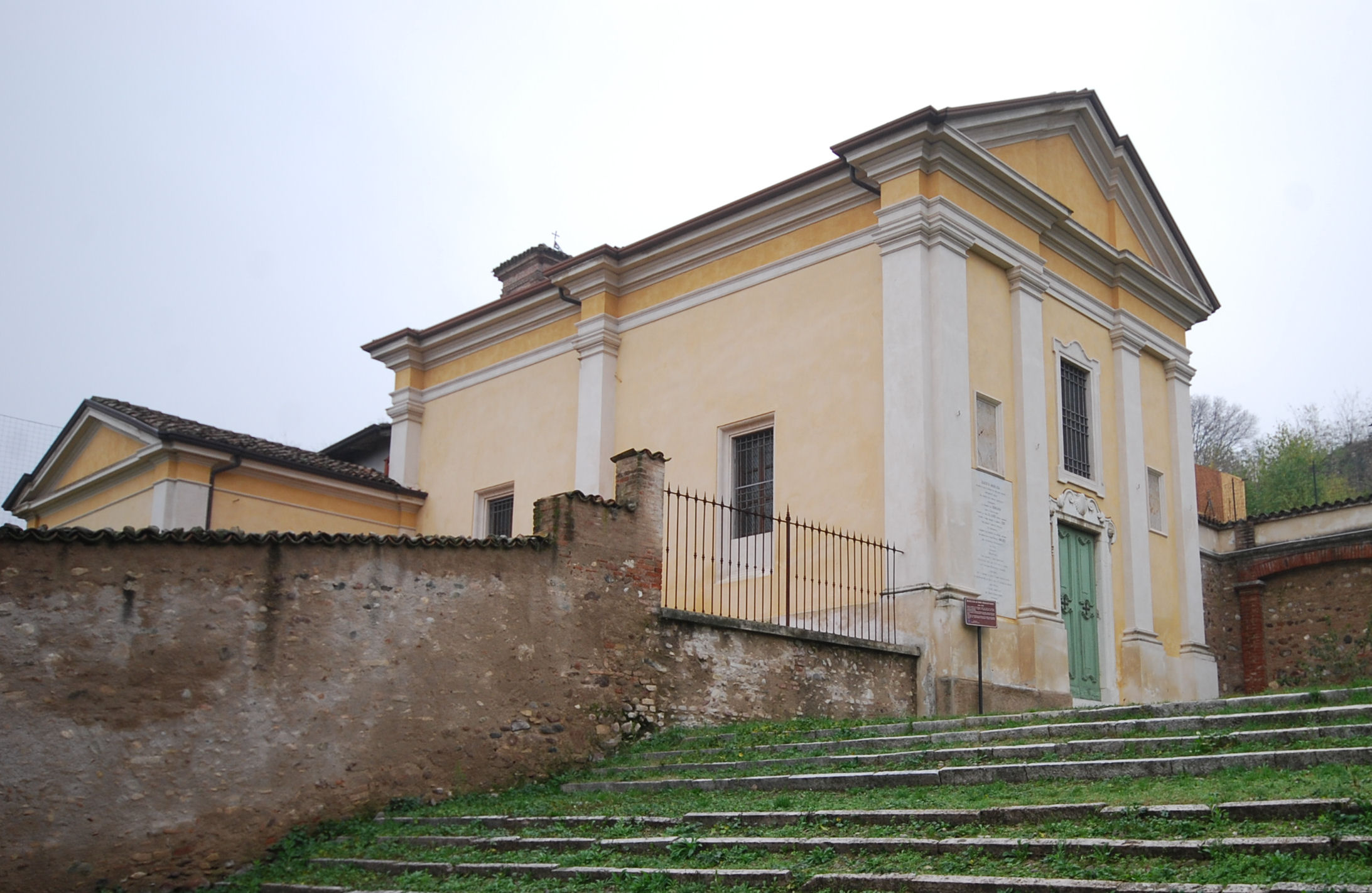
The Basilica of San Sebastiano in Castiglione delle Stiviere, built by Ferrante Gonzaga as an ex voto for escaping the plague of 1576

In December he and his wife left Castiglione for Casale Monferrato, where he had been made governor of the Marquisate of Monferrato by duke Guglielmo, which included the difficult task of strengthening the city militarily against its own subjects, who considered the Gonzagas to be usurpers. From 1582 to 1584 he was in Spain and Portugal as his health worsened. In 1584 he finally returned to his estates, whilst his eldest son Luigi retired to the monastery of Santa Maria in Castiglione delle Stiviere, renouncing the marquisate in 1585 in favour of his brother Rodolfo. Ferrante died in Milan and his body was brought to the monastery of San Pietro in Castiglione on the evening of 15 February, before being buried according to his wishes in the Gonzaga family vault at San Francesco, Mantua on 17 February.

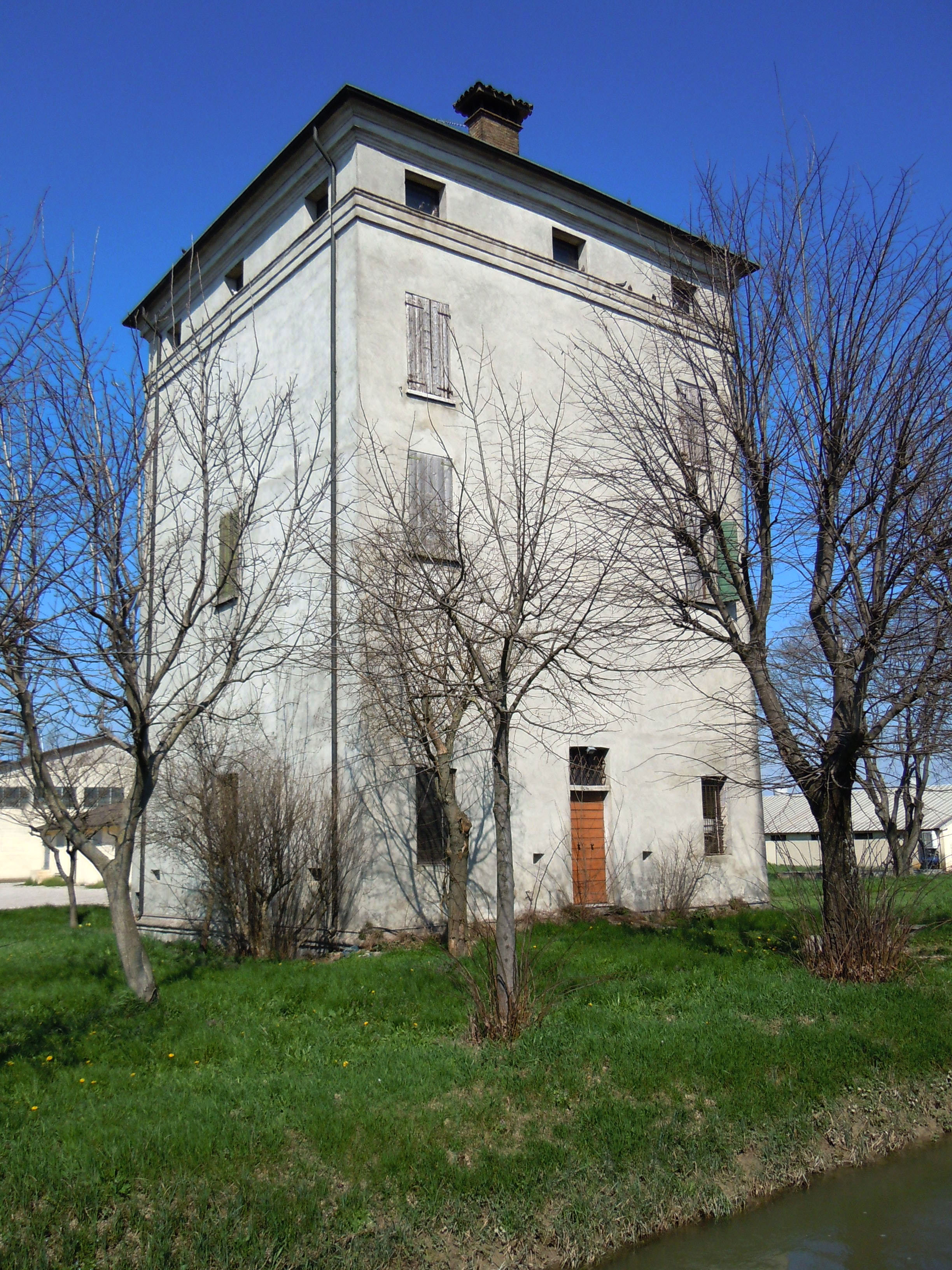
San Martino Gusnago, Torre di Corte Nuova, built in 1576 by Ferrante Gonzaga

== Issue ==
Ferrante and Marta had eight children:

- Luigi il Santo (1568–1591), abandoned the fiefdom to become a Jesuit;
- Rodolfo (1569–1593), second marquess of Castiglione;
- Ferrante (1570–1577);
- Carlo (1572–1574);
- Isabella (1574–1593), nun;
- Francesco (1577–1616), third marquess of Castiglione;
- Cristierno (1580–1630), marquess of Solferino and tutor to his nephew Luigi (1611–1636); had three children, Luigia (1611–1630), Carlo (1616–1680) and Francesco (1618–1630);
- Diego (1582–1597).

== Bibliography (in Italian) ==
- Bartolomeo Arrighi, Storia di Castiglione delle Stiviere sotto il dominio dei Gonzaga, Mantova, 1853.
- Costante Berselli, Castelgoffredo nella storia, Mantova, 1978.
- Città di Castiglione delle Stiviere (ed.), Castiglione attraverso i secoli, Verona, 2004. ISBN non esistente.
- Massimo Marocchi, I Gonzaga di Castiglione delle Stiviere. Vicende pubbliche e private del casato di San Luigi, Verona, 1990.
- Roberto Brunelli, I Gonzaga. Quattro secoli per una dinastia, Mantova, 2010.
- Giancarlo Malacarne, Gonzaga, Genealogie di una dinastia, Modena, Il Bulino, 2010, ISBN 978-88-86251-89-1.
- Francesco Brigoni, Medole attraverso i tempi, Medole, 1978.
