= Ferrante Aporti =

Italian theologian (1791–1858)

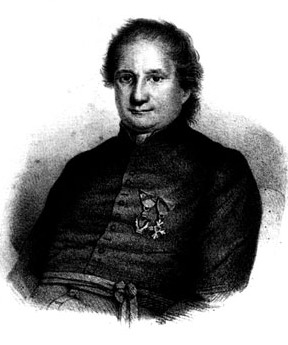
Ferrante Aporti.

Ferrante Aporti (20 November 1791 – 14 November 1858) was an Italian educator and theologian.

== Biography ==
Aporti was born at San Martino dall'Argine (in what is now the province of Mantua, northern Italy).

After his ordination to the priesthood and a three-years' course in Vienna, he was appointed professor of church history in the seminary of Cremona and superintendent of schools in the same city. He took a special interest in the education of poor children and opened an infant school at Cremona in 1827 for their benefit.

The success of this undertaking led to the establishment of similar schools in various cities of Italy. Aporti visited each, encouraged the teachers, and published for their guidance: Il manuale per le scuole infantili (Cremona, 1833) and Sillabario per l'infanzia (Cremona, 1837). He also gave, in the University of Turin, a course of instruction on educational methods which attracted a large number of teachers.

He received from the French Government the title of Chevalier of the Legion of Honour in 1846, and from Victor Emmanuel the rank of Senator in 1848. He was called in 1855 to the rectorship of the University of Turin, a position which he held until shortly before his death.
