= Caterina Anguissola =

Italian noblewoman

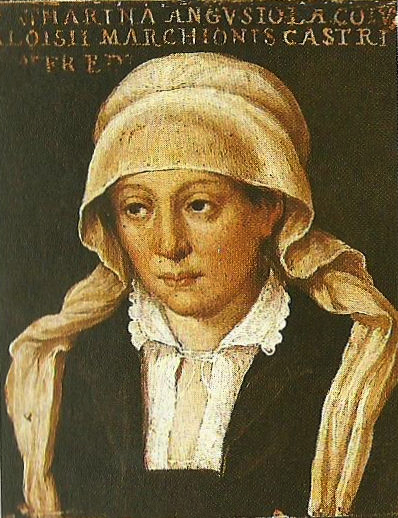
- Predecessor: Ginevra Rangoni
- Successor: Ippolita Maggi
- Born: 1508; Piacenza
- Died: 13 December 1550 (aged 41–42); Castel Goffredo
- Buried: Chiesa di Santa Maria del Consorzio, Castel Goffredo
- Issue: Alfonso; Ferrante; Orazio
- Father: Gian Giacomo Anguissola
- Mother: Angela Radini Tedeschi

Caterina Anguissola Trivulzio (Piacenza, 1508 circa – Castel Goffredo, December 13, 1550) was an Italian noblewoman.

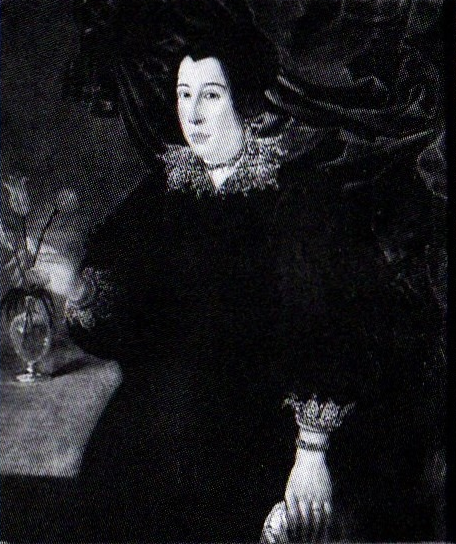
Portrait of Caterina Anguissola

== Biography ==
She was the daughter of Gian Giacomo Anguissola, of the line of Vigolzone, Count of Piacenza, and of Angela Radini Tedeschi.

Widow of Count Andrea Borgo (or Burgo) of Cremona (1467–1533), Count of Castelleone, in December 1540, she married Aloisio Gonzaga, Lord of Castel Goffredo. After his death in 1549, Caterina governed, through Giovanni Anguissola, the marquisate of Castel Goffredo, until the investiture of her son Alfonso in 1565. Her beauty was exalted by humanist Lodovico Domenichi in his work La Nobiltà delle Donne.

She died in Castel Goffredo in 1550 and was buried in the mausoleum of the Gonzaga family in Chiesa di Santa Maria del Consorzio.

== Issue ==
Aloisio and Caterina had three children:

- Alfonso (1541–1592), second Marquis of Castel Goffredo;
- Ferrante (1544–1586), first Marquis of Castiglione;
- Orazio (1545–1587), Marquis of Solferino.

== Lineage ==
Bernardo Anguissola
Giovanni Carlo Anguissola
Sveva Sanseverino
Gian Giacomo Anguissola
Cristoforo II Torelli di Montechiarugolo
Caterina Torelli d'Aragona Visconti
Ippolita Sanseverino
Caterina Anguissola
Lazzaro I Radini Tedeschi
Daniele II Radini Tedeschi
Ermellina Grassi
Angela Radini Tedeschi
...
Caterina Panichi
...
