= Vespasiano I Gonzaga =

Italian nobleman

- Duke of Sabbioneta
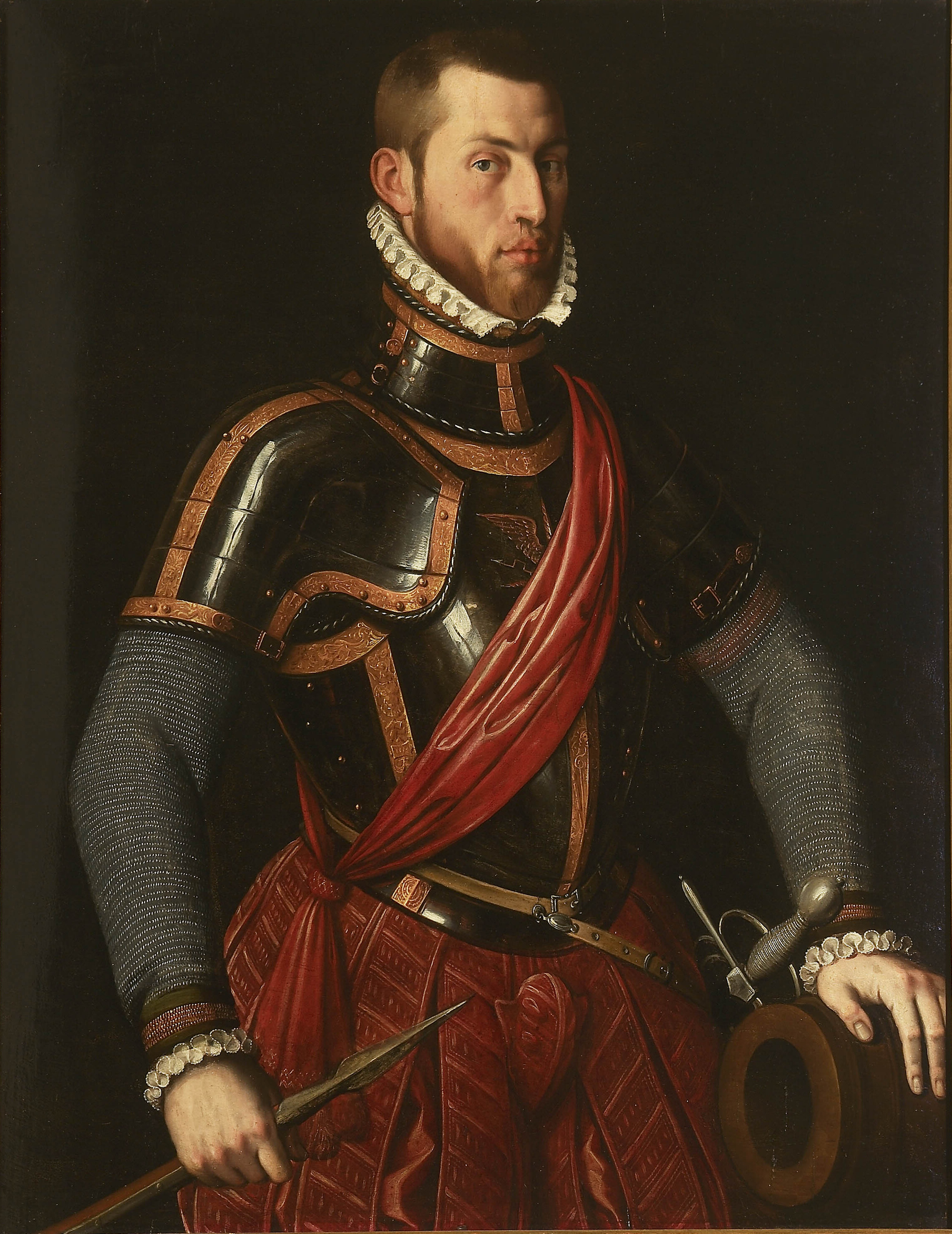
- Born: 6 December 1531; Fondi, Latium, Italy
- Died: 26 February 1591 (aged 59); Sabbioneta, Lombardy, Italy
- Issue: Isabella Gonzaga
- Father: Louis Gonzaga, Lord of Palazzolo
- Mother: Isabella Colonna

Vespasiano I Gonzaga, Duke of Sabbioneta (6 December 1531 – 26 February 1591) was an Italian nobleman, diplomat, writer, military engineer and condottiero. He is remembered as a patron of the arts and the founder of Sabbioneta, a town in Lombardy designed according to the Renaissance principles of the "ideal city".

== Early life ==
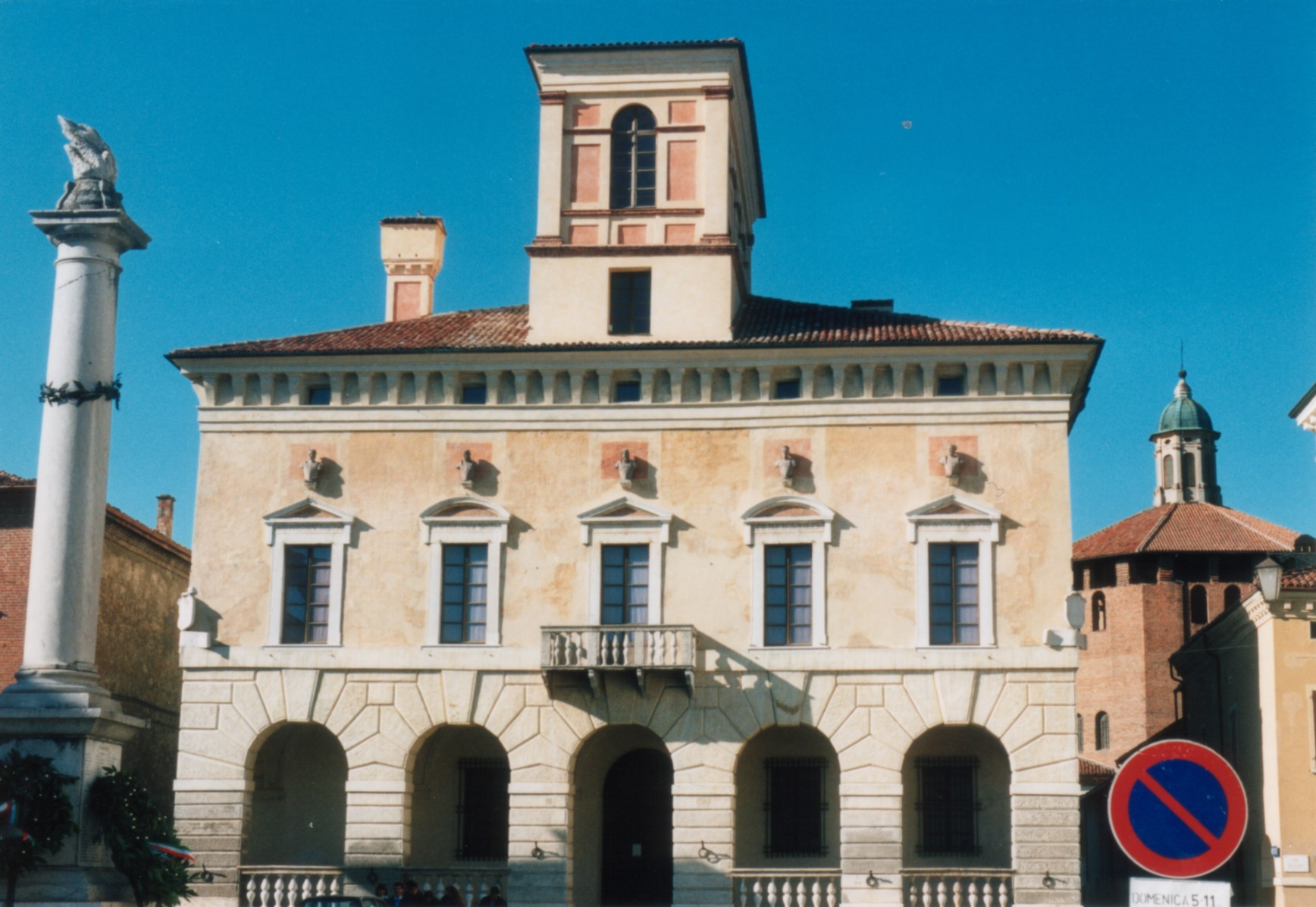
The Ducal Palace of Sabbioneta.

He was born in Fondi, a Colonna fief in the southern Latium, the son of Isabella Colonna and the condottiero Louis "Rodomonte" Gonzaga, Lord of Palazzolo, a member of a cadet branch of the House of Gonzaga, Dukes of Mantua. Soon orphaned, he was educated under his aunt Giulia Gonzaga, who had moved to Naples to escape attempts from other members of the Colonna family to kill Vespasiano in order to obtain the fiefs he had inherited from his mother.

From his mother's second marriage in 1534 to Philip de Lannoy, 2nd Prince of Sulmona, he was the elder half-brother of Maria de Lannoy (who became nun in the monastery of Santa Maria Donna Regina in Naples), Charles de Lannoy, 3rd Prince of Sulmona (who married Costanza Doria del Carretto), Beatrice de Lannoy (who married Alfonso de Guevara, 5th Count of Potenza, and Alberto Acquaviva d'Aragona, 12th Duke of Atri), Horace de Lannoy, 4th Prince of Sulmona (who married Antonia d'Avalos), and Vittoria de Lannoy (who married Giulio Antonio Acquaviva d'Aragona, 1st Prince of Caserta).

== Career ==
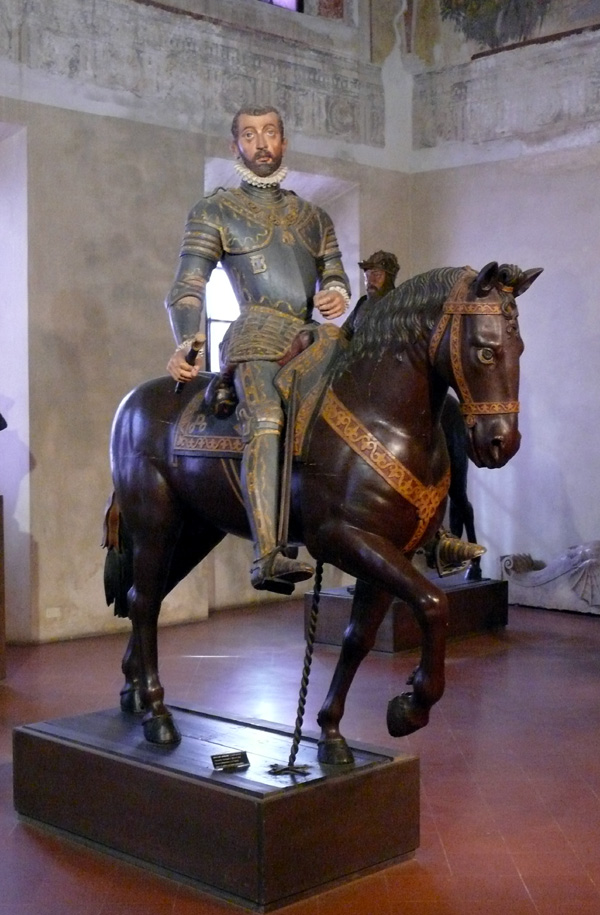
Equestrian statue of Vespasiano I Gonzaga-Colonna in the Ducal Palace of Sabbioneta.

At the age of eleven he was sent to the Spanish royal court to complete his education under King Philip II of Spain, to whom he was distantly related through mutual descent from Kings of Aragon. The latter found in Vespasiano one of his most faithful advisers, and made him a Grandee of Spain and then Viceroy of Navarre and Valencia.

In 1556, he started his major project, the construction of a new, ideal city between Mantua and Parma which he christened "Sabbioneta" ("Sandy"), as it was to rise on the sandy banks of the Po River. The project was finished in 1591. Sabbioneta had been declared an autonomous Duchy in 1577, thanks to the personal support of Vespasiano's friend Rudolf II of Habsburg, whom he had met in the Spanish court.

== Personal life ==
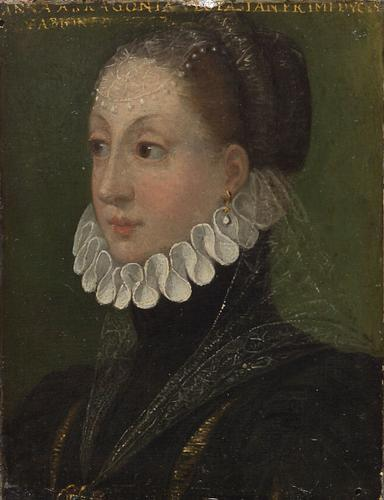
Anna d'Aragona, his second wife

Gonzaga was thrice married. His first marriage was to Diana Folch de Cardona (1531–1559), a daughter of Antonio Folch de Cardona and Beatriz de Luna.

After her death, he married Anna d'Aragona y Folch de Cardona (d. 1567), a daughter of Alfonso de Aragón y Portugal. Before her death in 1567, they were the parents of:

- Giulia Gonzaga (b. c. 1565)
- Isabella Gonzaga (1565–1637), his heiress; she married Luigi Carafa, 4th Prince of Stigliano.
- Luigi Gonzaga (1566–1580), who died aged 14; Aldous Huxley claims that Vespasiano kicked Luigi to death over Luigi failing to touch his cap in the street to him.

His third, and final, marriage was to Margherita Gonzaga (1562–1618), a daughter of Cesare I Gonzaga, Lord of Guastalla.

He died at Sabbioneta in 1591 and his estate was inherited by his surviving daughter, Isabella.
