= Louis Gonzaga (Rodomonte) =

Italian mercenary (1500–1532)

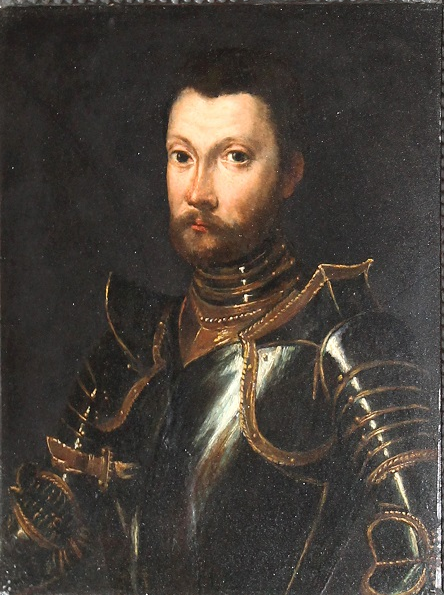
Portrait of Luigi Gonzaga, by Fermo Guisoni.

Louis Gonzaga (Italian: Luigi; 16 August 1500 – 2 December 1532), nicknamed "Rodomonte" due to his physical prowess, was an Imperial mercenary captain for Emperor Charles V.

== Biography ==
Born at Mantua, Gonzaga was the eldest son of Ludovico Gonzaga, Count of Rodigo, a cadet member of the House of Gonzaga. He joined the forces of Charles V, Holy Roman Emperor, on his visit to England. In 1527 he participated in the Sack of Rome, and personally escorted the besieged Pope Clement VII from his refuge in the Castel Sant'Angelo to the town of Orvieto. As a reward for his services, Rodomonte was able to marry Isabella Colonna, daughter of Vespasiano Colonna (and granddaughter of the general Prospero Colonna), with whom he had one son, Vespasiano Gonzaga, born in 1531. He then led the papal armies in the siege of Ancona, and later began the conquest of Vicovaro. In the latter battle, he received a mortal arquebus wound.

His son Vespasiano succeeded him and became Duke of Sabbioneta and Traetto, Marquis of Ostiano, and Count of Rodigo and Fondi. He was brought up by his sister Giulia, the young widow of Rodomonte's father-in-law Vespasiano Colonna.

== Sources ==
- Ireneo Affò (1780). Vita di Luigi Gonzaga, detto Rodomonte, Principe del Sacro Romano Impero. Parma: Presso Filippo Carmignani.
