= Luzzara =

- Comune
- Comune di Luzzara
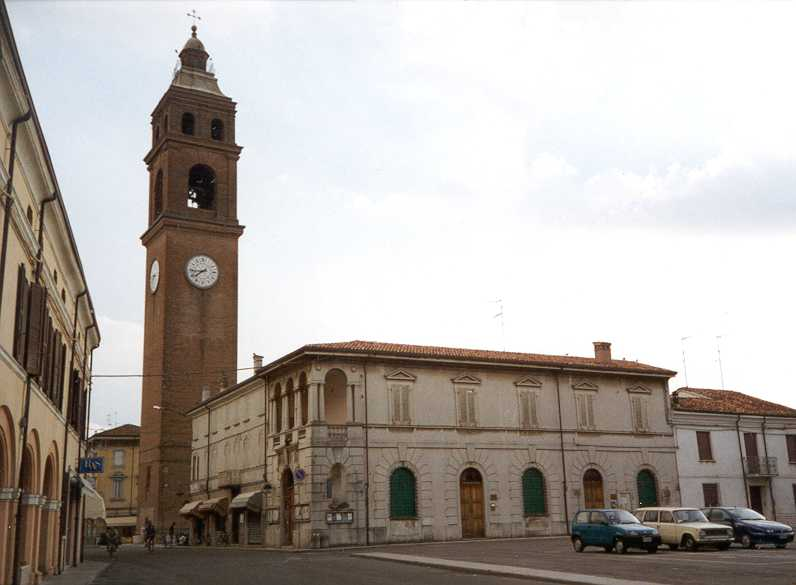
- View of Luzzara

- Coat of arms

- Location within Italy Location within Emilia-Romagna
- Coordinates: 44°58′N 10°41′E
- Country: Italy
- Region: Emilia-Romagna
- Province: Reggio Emilia (RE)
- Frazioni: see list

Government
  - Mayor: Elisabetta Sottili

Area
  - Total: 39 km^{2} (15 sq mi)
- Elevation: 15 m (49 ft)

Population (31 December 2016)
  - Total: 9,132
  - Density: 230/km^{2} (610/sq mi)
- Demonym: Luzzaresi
- Time zone: UTC+1 (CET)
  - Summer (DST): UTC+2 (CEST)
- Postal code: 42045
- Dialing code: 0522
- Patron saint: St. George
- Saint day: March 19
- Website: Official website

Luzzara (Guastallese: Lüsèra) is a comune in the province of Reggio Emilia, in Emilia-Romagna, Italy. It is located at the northern end of the province, on the right bank of the river Po.

Luzzara is the birthplace of the composer Maurizio Cazzati and film director and writer Cesare Zavattini. It is also the place where the Battle of Luzzara in the Spanish War of Succession was fought.

== Frazioni ==
Arginello, Bacchiellino, Borgo Po, Buca Bertona, Cantone, Casoni, Codisotto, Corghe, Cugini, Delfina, Negre, San Carlo, Vergari Alti, Vergari Bassi, Villa Superiore, Villarotta.

== Bounding communes ==
- Dosolo
- Gonzaga
- Guastalla
- Reggiolo
- Suzzara

== Population history ==
| Year | Population |
|---|---|
| 1861 | 7,511 |
| 1871 | 7,731 |
| 1881 | 7,719 |
| 1901 | 9,280 |
| 1911 | 9,785 |
| 1921 | 10,379 |
| 1931 | 10,087 |
| 1936 | 9,946 |
| 1951 | 9,738 |
| 1961 | 8,579 |
| 1971 | 8,122 |
| 1981 | 8,023 |
| 1991 | 7,949 |
| 2001 | 8,517 |
| 2011 | 9,232 |
| 2021 | 10,562 |
