= Bozzolo =

Bozzolo Bosul (Emilian)
- Comune
- Comune di Bozzolo
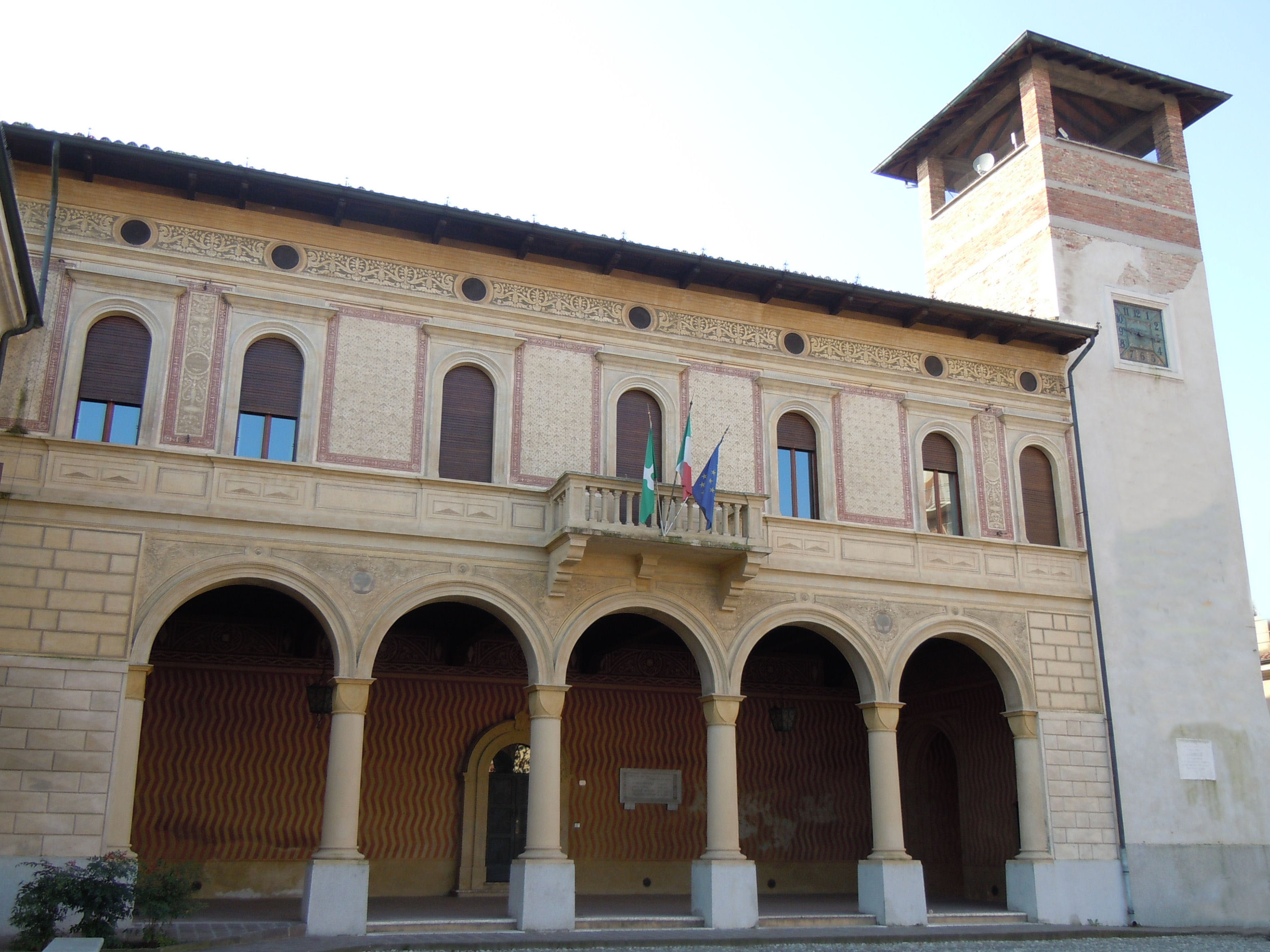
- View of Bozzolo

- Coat of arms

- Location within Italy Location within Lombardy
- Coordinates: 45°6′N 10°29′E
- Country: Italy
- Region: Lombardy
- Province: Mantua (MN)

Government
  - Mayor: Giuseppe Torchio

Area
  - Total: 18.8 km^{2} (7.3 sq mi)
- Elevation: 30 m (98 ft)

Population (2015)
  - Total: 5,103
  - Density: 271/km^{2} (703/sq mi)
- Demonym: Bozzolesi
- Time zone: UTC+1 (CET)
  - Summer (DST): UTC+2 (CEST)
- Postal code: 46012
- Dialing code: 0376
- Website: Official website

Bozzolo (Mantovano: Bosul) is a comune (municipality) in the Province of Mantua in the Italian region Lombardy, located about 110 kilometres (68 mi) southeast of Milan and about 25 kilometres (16 mi) southwest of Mantua.

Bozzolo borders the following municipalities: Acquanegra sul Chiese, Calvatone, Marcaria, Rivarolo Mantovano, San Martino dall'Argine, Tornata. Writer Lucrezia Gonzaga, daughter of local condottiero Pirro Gonzaga, was born here in 1522.

== Notable people ==
- Primo Mazzolari, (1890-1959), parson from 1932 to 1959, writer and partisan
