= Dosolo =

Dosolo Dözul (Emilian)
- Comune
- Comune di Dosolo
- Location within Italy Location within Lombardy
- Coordinates: 44°57′N 10°38′E
- Country: Italy
- Region: Lombardy
- Province: Province of Mantua (MN)
- Frazioni: Correggioverde, Villastrada

Area
  - Total: 26.0 km^{2} (10.0 sq mi)
- Elevation: 25 m (82 ft)

Population (Dec. 2004)
  - Total: 3,265
  - Density: 126/km^{2} (325/sq mi)
- Time zone: UTC+1 (CET)
  - Summer (DST): UTC+2 (CEST)
- Postal code: 46030
- Dialing code: 0375

Dosolo (Casalasco-Viadanese: Dözul) is a comune (municipality) in the Province of Mantua in the Italian region Lombardy, located about 130 kilometres (81 mi) southeast of Milan and about 25 kilometres (16 mi) southwest of Mantua. As of 31 December 2004, it had a population of 3,265 and an area of 26.0 square kilometres (10.0 mi^{2}).

The municipality of Dosolo contains the frazioni (subdivisions, mainly villages and hamlets) Correggioverde and Villastrada.

Dosolo borders the following municipalities: Gualtieri, Guastalla, Luzzara, Pomponesco, Suzzara, Viadana.

== Demographic evolution ==
Historical population

Year	Pop.	±%
1861	3,593	—
1871	4,020	+11.9%
1881	3,975	−1.1%
1901	3,934	−1.0%
1911	4,148	+5.4%

Year	Pop.	±%
1921	4,136	−0.3%
1931	4,255	+2.9%
1936	4,324	+1.6%
1951	4,101	−5.2%
1961	3,546	−13.5%

Year	Pop.	±%
1971	3,564	+0.5%
1981	3,378	−5.2%
1991	3,160	−6.5%
2001	3,104	−1.8%

Source: Data from ISTAT
