= Gazzuolo =

Gazzuolo Gasöl (Emilian)
- Comune
- Comune di Gazzuolo
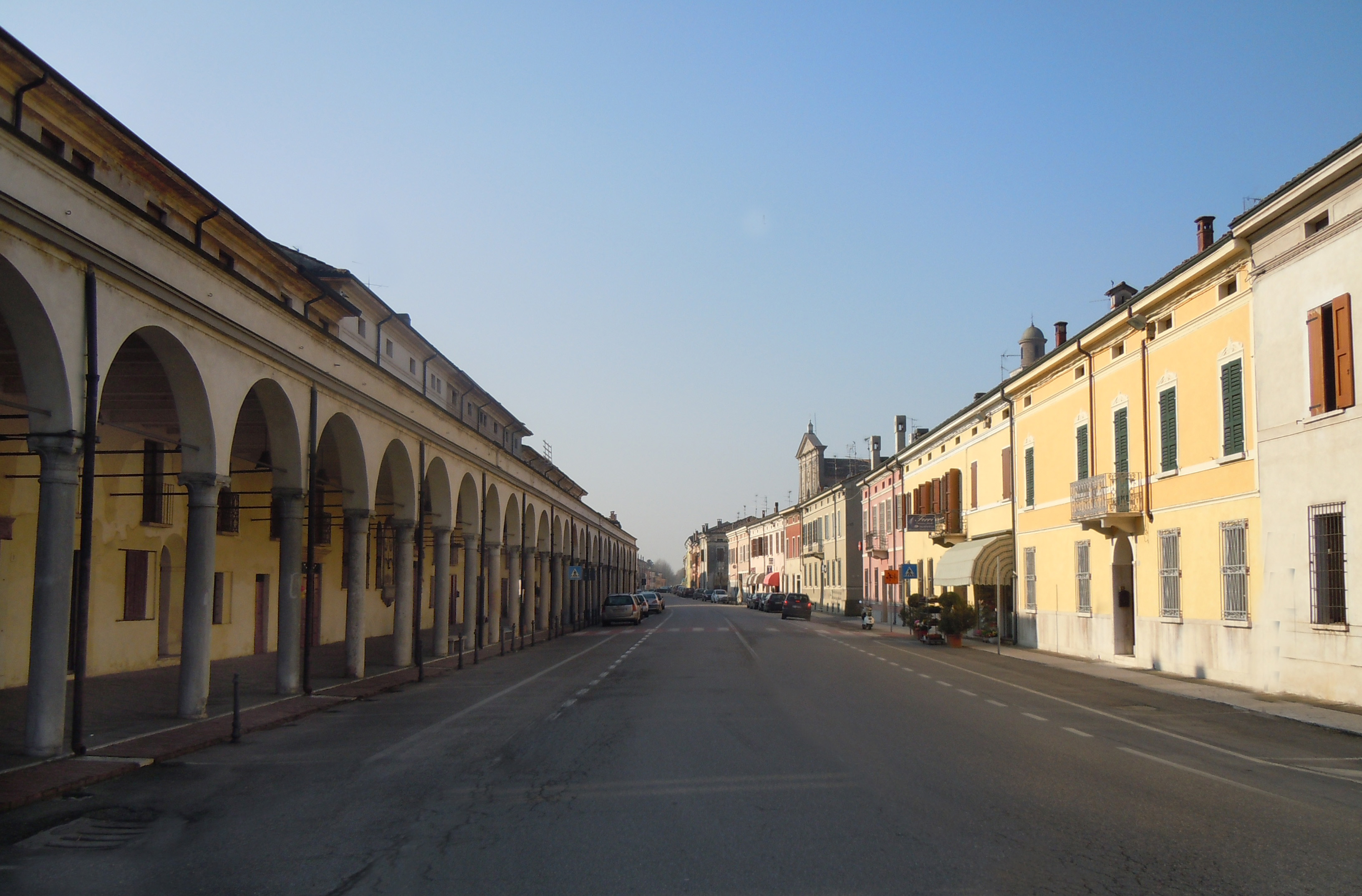

- Coat of arms

- Location within Italy Location within Lombardy
- Coordinates: 45°4′N 10°35′E
- Country: Italy
- Region: Lombardy
- Province: Mantua (MN)
- Frazioni: Belforte, Bocca Chiavica, Pomara, Nocegrossa, La Marchesa

Government
  - Mayor: Loris Contesini

Area
  - Total: 22.3 km^{2} (8.6 sq mi)
- Elevation: 25 m (82 ft)

Population (31 July 2014)
  - Total: 2,377
  - Density: 107/km^{2} (276/sq mi)
- Demonym: Gazzolesi
- Time zone: UTC+1 (CET)
  - Summer (DST): UTC+2 (CEST)
- Postal code: 46010
- Dialing code: 0376
- Website: Official website

Gazzuolo (Mantovano: Gasöl) is a comune (municipality) in the Province of Mantua in the Italian region Lombardy, located about 120 kilometres (75 mi) southeast of Milan and about 20 kilometres (12 mi) southwest of Mantua. The town had been a possession of Gonzaga family, the lord of Mantua, from the late Middle Ages, and John Hawkwood, a famous English mercenary captain in 14th-century Italy, was once the lord of this town in 1370s'-80s'.

Gazzuolo borders the following municipalities: Commessaggio, Marcaria, San Martino dall'Argine, Spineda, Viadana.

== Main sights ==
- Gonzaga porticoes
- Palazzo Gonzaga
- Church of Maria Nascente (17th century)
- Church of St. Roch
- Oratory of San Pietro al Belforte (10th century)
