= San Martino dall'Argine =

San Martino Dall'argine San Martèn dl'Àrsan (Emilian)
- Comune
- Comune di San Martino Dall'argine
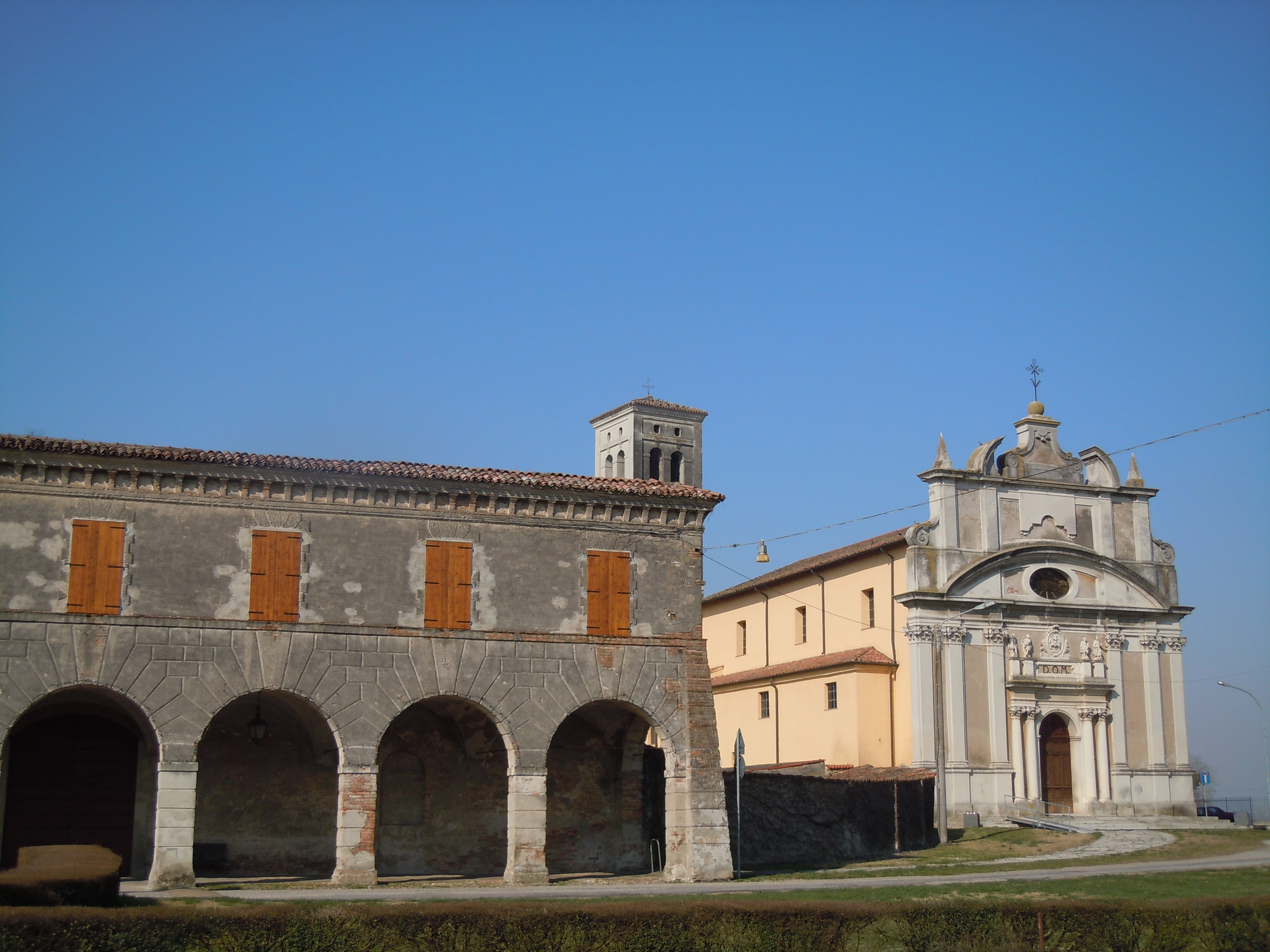

- Coat of arms

- Location within Italy Location within Lombardy
- Coordinates: 45°6′N 10°30′E
- Country: Italy
- Region: Lombardy
- Province: Mantua (MN)

Government
  - Mayor: Alessandro Bozzoli

Area
  - Total: 17.0 km^{2} (6.6 sq mi)

Population (1 January 2009)
  - Total: 1,837
  - Density: 108/km^{2} (280/sq mi)
- Time zone: UTC+1 (CET)
  - Summer (DST): UTC+2 (CEST)
- Postal code: 46010
- Dialing code: 0376
- Website: Official website

San Martino Dall'argine (Mantovano: San Martèn dl'Àrsan) is a comune (municipality) in the Province of Mantua in the Italian region Lombardy, located about 110 kilometres (68 mi) southeast of Milan and about 25 kilometres (16 mi) southwest of Mantua.

== Notable people ==
- Ferrante Aporti
- Achille Graffigna
