= Eleonora Gonzaga (born 1630) =

Holy Roman Empress from 1651 to 1657

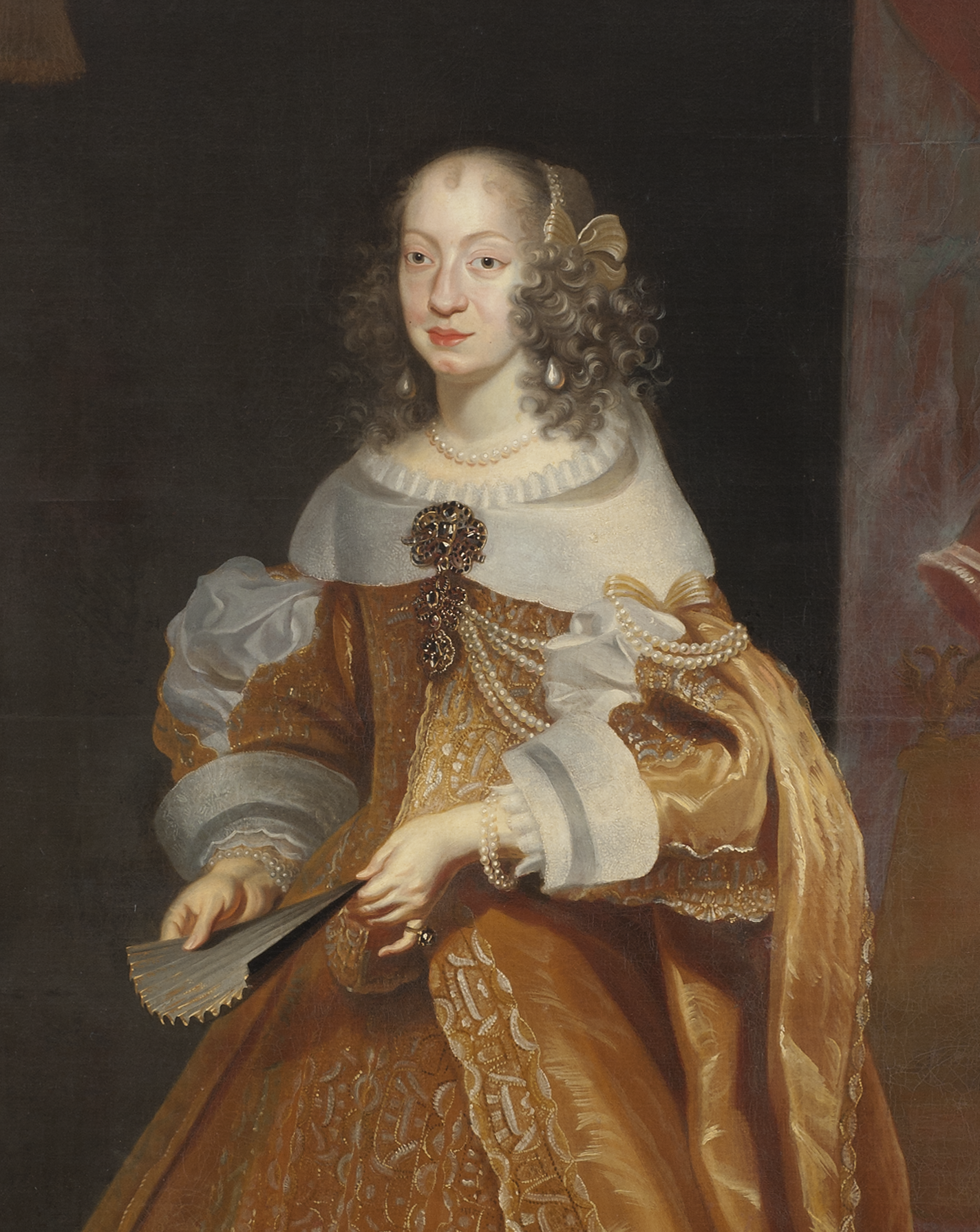
- Portrait by Frans Luycx, c. 1650

Holy Roman Empress
- Tenure: 30 April 1651 – 2 April 1657
- Coronation: 4 August 1653
- Born: 18 November 1630; Mantua, Duchy of Mantua
- Died: 6 December 1686 (aged 56); Vienna, Austria
- Burial: Imperial Crypt, Vienna, Austria
- Spouse: Ferdinand III, Holy Roman Emperor (m. 1651; died 1657)
- Issue Detail: Eleonore Maria Josefa, Queen of Poland; Maria Anna Josepha, Electoral Princess of the Palatinate
- House: Gonzaga
- Father: Charles II Gonzaga, Duke of Nevers
- Mother: Maria Gonzaga, Duchess of Montferrat

Eleonora Gonzaga (18 November 1630 – 6 December 1686) was by birth Princess of Mantua, Nevers and Rethel from the Nevers branch of the House of Gonzaga, and was Holy Roman Empress, German Queen, Queen consort of Hungary and Bohemia by marriage to Emperor Ferdinand III.

Nicknamed the Younger (de: Jüngere) to distinguish herself from her namesake grandaunt, she was considered one of the most educated and virtuous women of her time. Fascinated by religious poetry, she founded a literary academy and was also a patron of musical theater. As Holy Roman Empress, she promoted the development of cultural and spiritual life at the Imperial court in Vienna, and despite being a staunch Catholic and benefactress of several monasteries, she had a tolerant attitude towards Protestantism.

She established two female orders: the Order of Virtuosity (1662) and the Order of the Starry Cross (1668).

== Life ==
=== Early years ===
Eleonora was born on 18 November 1630 in Mantua, as the second child of Charles Gonzaga, styled Duke of Nevers (heir of the Duchy of Mantua), and his wife and cousin Maria Gonzaga (heiress to the Duchy of Montferrat). On her father's side her grandparents were Charles Gonzaga, Duke of Nevers and Rethel and Catherine of Mayenne—a member of the House of Lorraine—and on her mother's side her grandparents were Francesco IV Gonzaga, Duke of Mantua, and Margaret of Savoy.

She was named after her mother's paternal aunt Holy Roman Empress Eleonora, who was also her godmother. The marriage of Eleonora's parents was made with the purpose to reinforce the claims of the Nevers branch of the House of Gonzaga to the duchies of Mantua and Montferrat when the main line would become extinct. The duke of Nevers, a vassal of the Kingdom of France, had to face the opposition of Ferrante II Gonzaga, Duke of Guastalla, who counted with the support of the Holy Roman Empire, the Kingdom of Spain and Duchy of Savoy, and thus started the War of the Mantuan Succession, during which infant Eleonora, with her parents and older brother Charles had to leave Mantua, but returned one year later after the signing of the Treaty of Cherasco (19 June 1631), under which were recognized the rights of Duke Charles of Nevers over the duchies of Mantua (as the closest male relative of the extinct main line of the House of Gonzaga) and Montferrat (due to the marriage of his heir with Maria Gonzaga, the last surviving scion of the main Gonzaga line and heiress of that duchy, which was demonstrably heritable by females since the Gonzagas had acquired it through marriage to Margherita Paleologa in 1540); however one month later (30 August 1631), Eleonora's father died of tuberculosis, and began a series of political conflicts between Duke Charles and her daughter-in-law, who ended with the banishment of Margaret of Savoy (Maria's mother) from Mantua.

During this time, Eleonora lived in the Church of Sant'Orsola, where she remained with her mother until 1637, when after the death of her grandfather, her older brother became the new duke of Mantua and Montferrat under the regency of their mother Maria. The princess received an excellent education, being fluent in French, Spanish and Italian, well versed in literature, music and art, and expert in dances and embroidery. Already in her adolescence she manifested a poetic talent, which was expressed in her compositions of philosophical and religious poems.

=== Marriage and children ===
Eleonora's marriage was arranged by her godmother and namesake, the dowager Holy Roman Empress, who maintained close ties with her niece, the Duchess-Regent Maria, and became the main supporter of her election as wife of Ferdinand III, Holy Roman Emperor; previously, the dowager empress was also able to arrange the marriage of Duke Charles II of Mantua (Eleonora's brother) with Archduchess Isabella Clara of Austria (a member of the Tyrolese branch of the House of Habsburg) in 1649.

During the nuptial negotiations, the emperor promoted the following conditions: the Duchy of Mantua would continue its loyalty to the interests of the Holy Roman Empire, the bride would retain her possible inheritance rights over the Duchy of Montferrat, and a dowry of 400,000 thalers. Duke Charles II agreed with only minor changes: Mantua would maintain its loyalty to the Holy Roman Empire only if the alliance did not bring negative consequences to the duchy, and the bride's dowry would be paid in several installments in the next years.

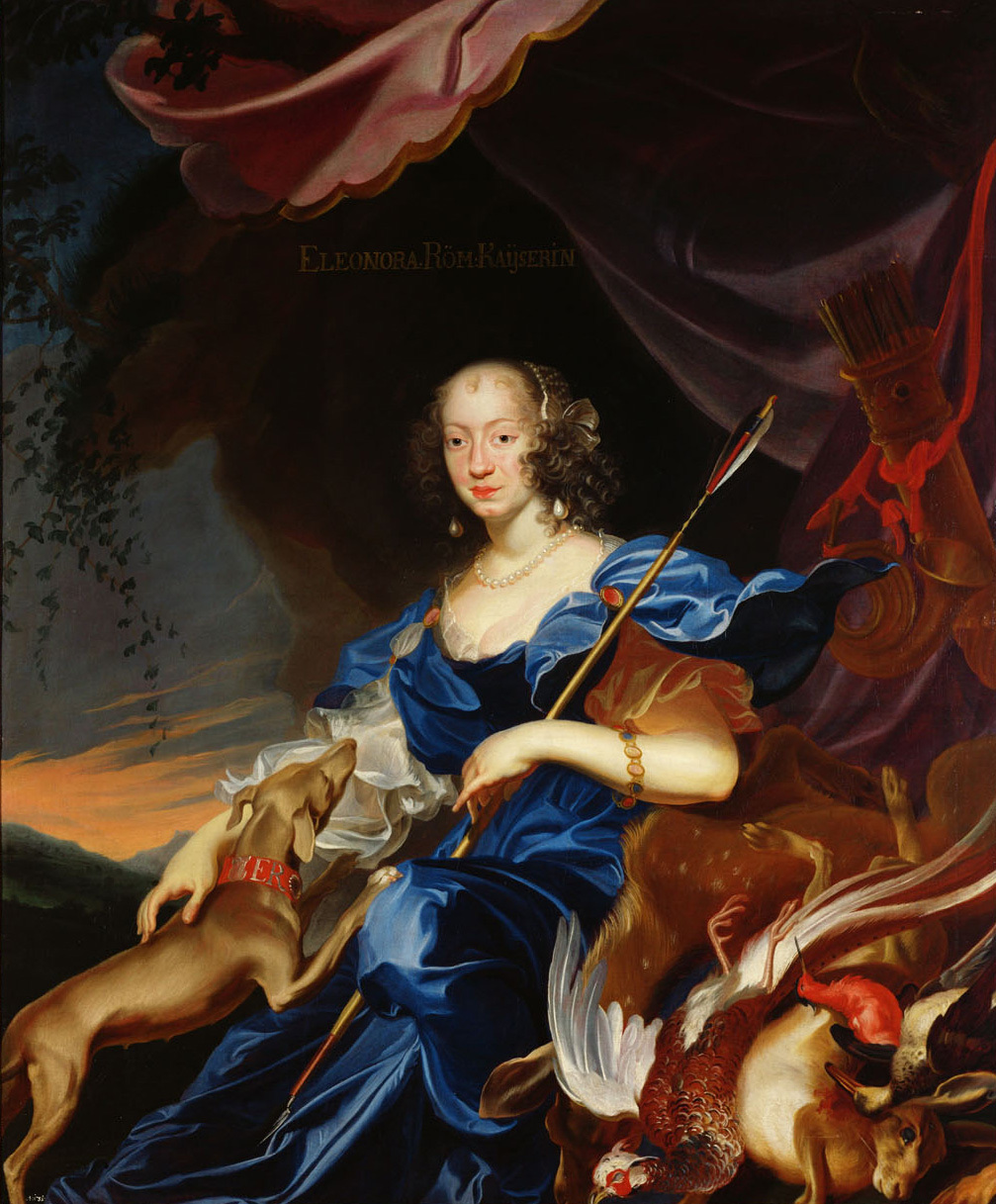
Empress Eleonora as Diana, by Frans Luycx, ca. 1651.

The marriage by proxy was solemnized on 2 March 1650 at the Basilica Palatina di Santa Barbara, where the emperor was represented by his ambassador, Count Johann Maximilian von Lamberg. The celebrations lasted until 22 March, when Eleonora, accompanied by some relatives, traveled from Mantua to Vienna. The cortege arrived at the Austrian city of Villach, where the bride said goodbye to her relatives and in the company of her godmother the dowager empress continued the trip to Wiener Neustadt, where on 30 April 1651 there took place the official wedding ceremony between Eleonora and Holy Roman Emperor Ferdinand III. After the ceremony, the emperor gave his new wife the family jewels and a gift of 50,000 florins. For Ferdinand III, this was his third marriage; he had had children from both previous unions.

In spite of the great difference in age, the marriage was a happy one. The active and sweet nature of the young empress helped her gain the sympathy of all members of the Imperial family. She established an excellent relationship with all her stepchildren. She learned German, and the emperor Italian. Together they participated in religious and secular ceremonies. Genuine piety of both spouses did not prevent them from patronizing literature and music activities, like visits to theaters or hunting, which was one of the passions of the empress. In her portrait by Frans Luycx, Eleonora is depicted in the image of Diana, the ancient goddess of hunting.

During her marriage, Eleonora gave birth to four children, two of whom survived into adulthood:

- Theresia Maria Josepha (27 March 1652 – 26 July 1653), Archduchess of Austria.
- Eleonora Maria Josepha (21 May 1653 – 17 December 1697), Archduchess of Austria; she married first Michael Korybut Wiśniowiecki, King of Poland, and then Charles V, Duke of Lorraine.
- Maria Anna Josepha (30 December 1654 – 4 April 1689), Archduchess of Austria; she married John William, Elector Palatine.
- Ferdinand Joseph Alois (11 February 1657 – 16 June 1658), Archduke of Austria.

=== Holy Roman Empress and German Queen ===
Eleonora was a cultured woman. Together with her husband she founded a literary academy, and, despite their religious and strict adherence to Catholicism, would not discriminate enrolled Protestants. The empress had always been in a society of educated people, and encouraged the development of science. After her arrival to Vienna, she increased the influence of the Italians, and her native language became the most used among the German aristocracy. Italian aristocrats and clergy held high positions. The Imperial court was, thanks to her, dominated by Italian fashion. The enormous influence of Italian culture was also noted in local literature, music, theater, architecture and painting.

From the beginning her married life Eleonora accompanied her husband during his trips to the Holy Roman Empire. In 1652–1654 she was with him in Regensburg during the Reichstag. While her husband was engaged in public affairs, she was responsible for organizing celebrations such as the Carnival before Lent, culminating in the premiere of the opera L’Inganno d’amore (the Cheating of Love) by Antonio Bertali. On 4 August 1653 she was crowned Holy Roman Empress in Regensburg Cathedral; in 1655, she was crowned Queen of Hungary and on 11 September 1656 she was crowned Queen of Bohemia. In April 1657 Eleonora became a widow, and a year later her only son also died.

=== Widowhood ===
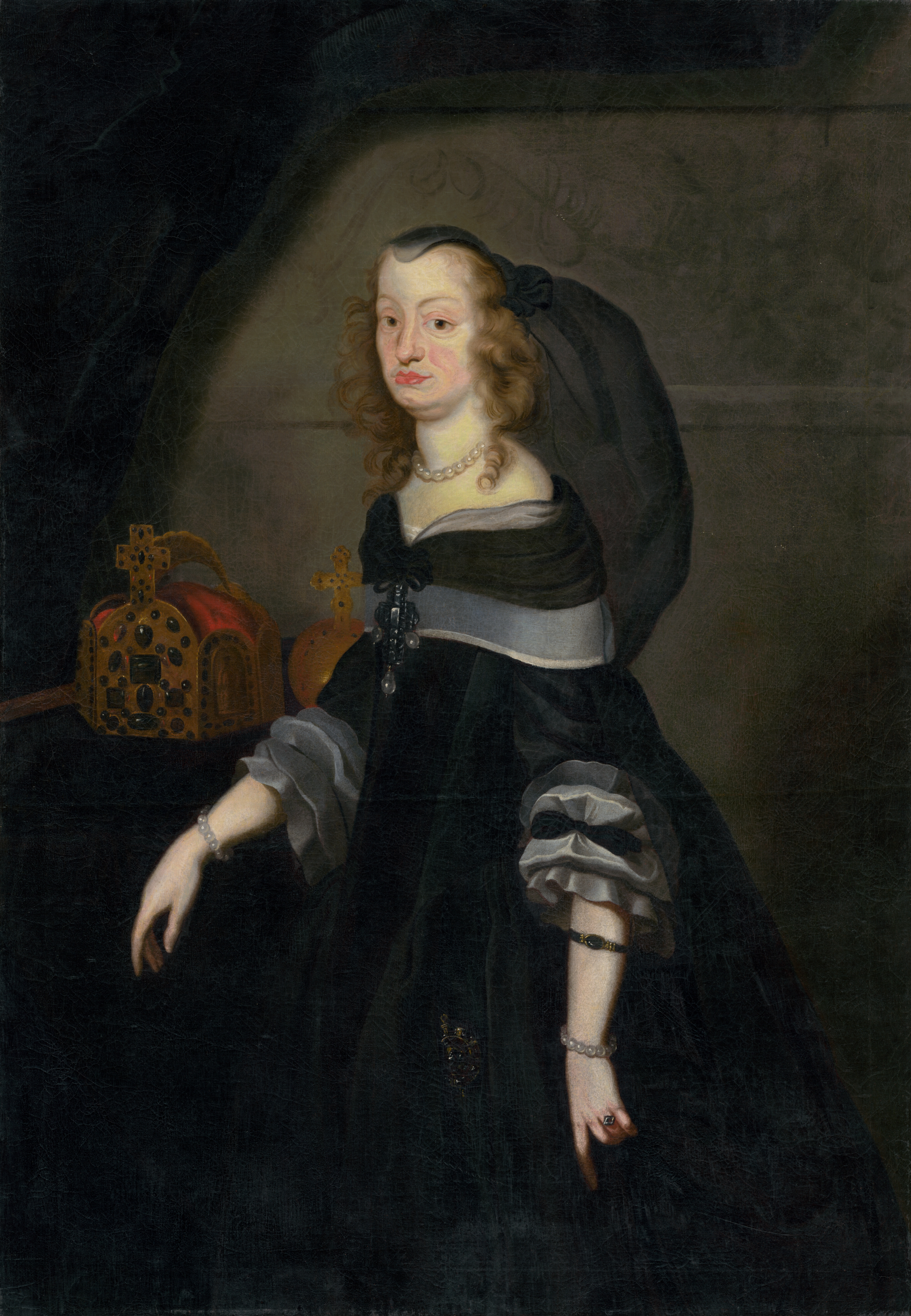
Eleonora as a widow

Archduke Leopold Wilhelm, Ferdinand III's younger brother, thought to marry Eleonora (who enjoyed the respect of her subjects) to strengthen his position as a candidate for the Imperial crown. However, the dowager empress put all her efforts to ensure the election of her stepson Leopold I as the new Holy Roman Emperor. Under the will of Ferdinand III, Eleonora assumed the guardianship of all his children. Her dower was provided by the cities of Graz and Linz and also was determined for her an annual pension of 200,000 florins (later increased to 230,000). During the summer she spent in the Favorita palace, which, together with Schönbrunn and Laxenburg she received from her godmother the late dowager empress. Under her supervision, an extension was added to the Hofburg, which then suffered a fire and was rebuilt again.

The small court of the empress dowager was a meeting place for politicians and diplomats. There were often visitors like Minister Václav Eusebius František, Prince of Lobkowicz, ambassadors Jacques Bretel de Grémonville and Lorenzo Magalotti, and General Raimondo Montecuccoli. For some time was considered the possibility of a second marriage for Eleonora, with the Polish King John II Casimir Vasa, but this project was never implemented.

Eleonora enjoyed great respect from Leopold I, who consulted with his stepmother on many political and personal issues. The dowager empress established good relations with her stepson's first wife, Infanta Margaret Theresa of Spain. The relationship with Leopold I's second wife Archduchess Claudia Felicitas of Austria was tense, but didn't last long due to her early death. Finally, she had a friendly relationship with Leopold I's third and final wife, Countess Palatine Eleonor Magdalene of Neuburg, who became the emperor's wife thanks to her protection.

The dowager empress engaged in politics only when on behalf of her family's interests. In 1669, Eleonora had to resolve the conflict between the Imperial court in Vienna and the Holy See, which arose due to the fact that the Pope didn't appoint any cardinal of the candidates proposed by the emperor. Then, Leopold I resorted to the mediation of his stepmother to solve the crisis. In 1671 she arranged the marriage of her nephew Ferdinando Carlo Gonzaga, Duke of Mantua and Montferrat with Anna Isabella Gonzaga, the heiress of the Guastalla line with the purpose to unite the two Gonzaga rival families. She tried that Charles V, Duke of Lorraine (suitor and later second husband of her eldest daughter) could be elected King of Poland, but he was defeated by John Sobieski in 1674.

Besides her political activity, Eleonora spent most of her time on works of charity and piety. In 1680 she invited the missionary and preacher Capuchin friar Marco d'Aviano to Linz. She was a patron of the Bavarian poet and painter Johann Georg Seidenbusch. She ordered the building in Vienna of a Baroque facade for the Kirche am Hof and the Jesuits. The Discalced Carmelites were also under her special patronage, and in Wiener Neustadt she helped them to build a monastery. To raise the level of education among girls, in 1663 Eleonora invited the Ursulines to Vienna, where they built a complex that included a monastery, a church and a school. She also established two Orders for women: the Order of Virtuosity (de: Sklavinnen der Tugend) in 1662 and the Order of the Starry Cross (de: Sternkreuzorden) in 1668.

=== Death ===
The last years of Eleonora's life were overshadowed by the epidemic of plague in 1679 and beginning of the Great Turkish War in 1683, in which, although the empire won, serious material damage was inflicted on the possessions of the dowager empress. In both cases, she had to flee from Vienna: the first time to Prague and Linz, and in the second to Linz and Innsbruck. Eleanora died in Vienna on 6 December 1686 and was buried in the Imperial Crypt.

== Ancestry ==
Ancestors of Eleonora Gonzaga (born 1630)^{(unless otherwise noted)}

8. Louis Gonzaga, Duke of Nevers
4. Charles I, Duke of Mantua
9. Henriette of Cleves
2. Charles Gonzaga
10. Charles, Duke of Mayenne
5. Catherine de Lorraine
11. Henriette of Savoy, Marquise de Villars
1. Eleonora Gonzaga
12. Vincenzo I Gonzaga
6. Francesco IV Gonzaga
13. Eleonora de' Medici
3. Maria Gonzaga
14. Charles Emmanuel I, Duke of Savoy
7. Margaret of Savoy
15. Catalina Micaela of Spain

== Notes ==
Eleonora Gonzaga (born 1630) House of Gonzaga Born: 18 November 1630 Died: 6 December 1686
Royal titles
Vacant Title last held by Maria Leopoldine of Austria	Holy Roman Empress; German Queen; Queen consort of Hungary and Bohemia; Archduchess consort of Austria; 1651–1657	Vacant Title next held by Margaret Theresa of Spain
