= Archduchess Maria Anna Josepha of Austria =

Electoral Princess of the Palatinate (1654–1689)

Maria Anna Josepha
- Electoral Princess of the Palatinate
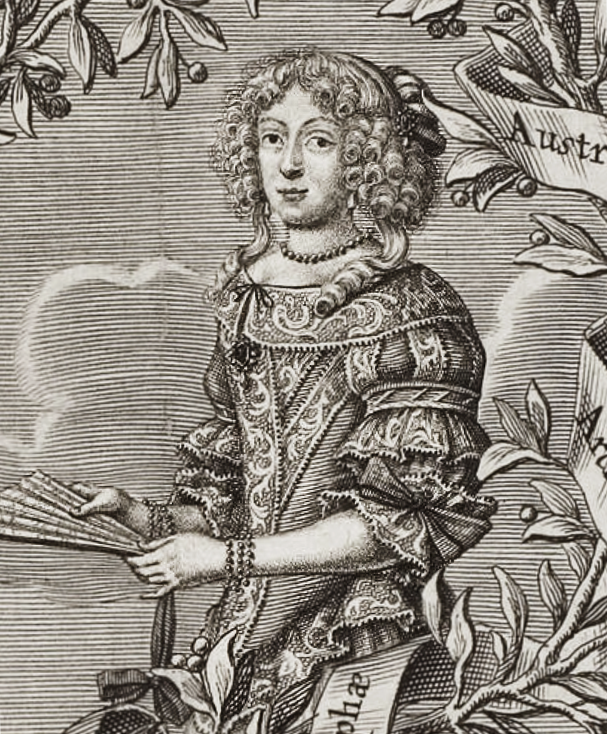
- Engraving, c. 1678
- Born: 20 December 1654; Free Imperial City of Regensburg, Holy Roman Empire
- Died: 4 April 1689 (aged 34); Vienna, Archduchy of Austria, Holy Roman Empire
- Burial: Imperial Crypt
- Spouse: Johann Wilhelm, Electoral Prince of the Palatine (m. 1678)
- House: Habsburg
- Father: Ferdinand III, Holy Roman Emperor
- Mother: Eleonora Gonzaga

Maria Anna Josepha of Austria (20 December 1654 – 4 April 1689) was an Austrian archduchess who became Electoral Princess of the Palatinate as the wife of Johann Wilhelm, Elector Palatine.

== Life ==
=== Early life ===
Archduchess Maria Anna Josepha was born on 20 December 1654 as the third child and daughter of Ferdinand III, Holy Roman Emperor (1608–1657) and his third wife, Eleonora Gonzaga (1630–1686). She also had had seven half-siblings from the previous two marriages of her father, only four of whom were still alive at the time of her birth. Her eldest full sibling, Archduchess Theresa Maria Josepha (1652–1653) died at the age of one and a half years, and her only younger sibling, Archduke Ferdinand Joseph Alois (1657–1658) also died in infancy.

=== Electoral Princess of the Palatinate ===
On 25 October 1678, twenty-four-years-old Maria Anna married twenty-years-old Electoral Prince Johann Wilhelm (John William) (1658–1716) from the House of Wittelsbach in Wiener Neustadt. He was the eldest son and heir of Philip William, Elector Palatine (1615–1690), and the brother-in-law of Maria Anna's eldest brother, Leopold I, Holy Roman Emperor (1640–1705). The wedding ceremony was performed by Archbishop Leopold Karl von Kollonitsch. The couple settled in Düsseldorf and led an elaborate household there. In 1679, her father-in-law gifted them the United Duchies of Jülich-Cleves-Berg. Upon Philip William's death, Johann Wilhelm became Elector Palatine and Duke of Neuburg.

=== Issue ===
During her marriage, Maria Anna gave birth to two children, but neither survived infancy:

- Son (born and died 6 February 1683).
- Son (born and died 5 February 1686).

=== Death ===
Maria Anna died of tuberculosis during a visit to Vienna. She was buried there in the Imperial Crypt beneath the Capuchin Church, the principal place of burial for members of the House of Habsburg.

== Ancestry ==
Ancestors of Archduchess Maria Anna Josepha of Austria

16. Ferdinand I, Holy Roman Emperor
8. Charles II of Austria
17. Anne of Bohemia and Hungary
4. Ferdinand II, Holy Roman Emperor
18. Albert V, Duke of Bavaria (= 20)
9. Maria Anna of Bavaria (≠ 5)
19. Anna of Austria (= 21)
2. Ferdinand III, Holy Roman Emperor
20. Albert V, Duke of Bavaria (= 18)
10. William V, Duke of Bavaria
21. Anna of Austria (= 19)
5. Maria Anna of Bavaria (≠ 9)
22. Francis I, Duke of Lorraine
11. Renata of Lorraine
23. Christina of Denmark
1. Maria Anna Josepha of Austria
24. Louis Gonzaga, Duke of Nevers
12. Charles I, Duke of Mantua
25. Henriette of Cleves
6. Charles II Gonzaga
26. Charles, Duke of Mayenne
13. Catherine of Mayenne
27. Henriette of Savoy, Marquise de Villars
3. Eleanor Gonzaga
28. Vincenzo I Gonzaga
14. Francesco IV Gonzaga
29. Eleonora de' Medici
7. Maria Gonzaga
30. Charles Emmanuel I, Duke of Savoy
15. Margaret of Savoy
31. Catherine Michaela of Spain
