= Archduchess Isabella Clara of Austria =

Duchess of Mantua and Montferrat from 1649 to 1665

Isabella Clara of Austria
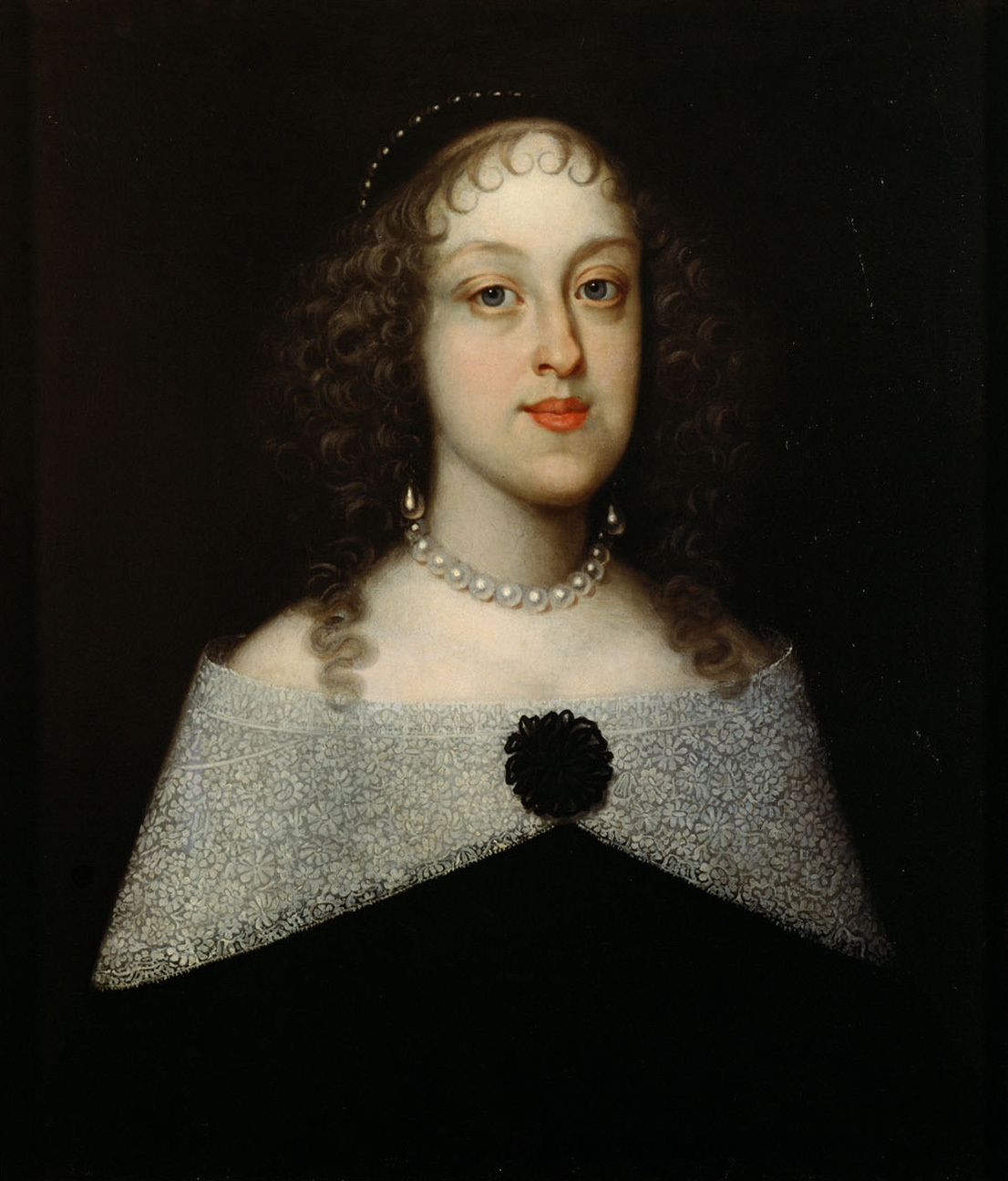
- Archduchess Isabella Clara in 1648

Duchess consort of Mantua and Montferrat
- Tenure: 7 November 1649 – 14 August 1665
- Born: 12 August 1629; Innsbruck, County of Tyrol, Holy Roman Empire
- Died: 24 February 1685 (aged 55); Mantua, Duchy of Mantua
- Spouse: Charles II, Duke of Mantua and Montferrat
- Issue: Ferdinand Charles, Duke of Mantua and Montferrat
- Father: Leopold V, Archduke of Further Austria and Count of Tyrol
- Mother: Claudia de' Medici

Isabella Clara of Austria (12 August 1629 – 24 February 1685) was a Duchess consort of Mantua, Montferrat, Nevers (until 1659), Mayenne (until 1654) and Rethel (until 1659) by marriage to Charles II, Duke of Mantua and Montferrat.

From 1665 to 1671, she was regent of the Duchies of Mantua and Montferrat on behalf of her minor son. Accused of marrying her lover without Imperial consent, she was forced to take the veil as a nun and was imprisoned at the Ursuline monastery of Mantua until her death.

== Life ==
=== Birth and family ===
Isabella Clara was born in Innsbruck on 12 August 1629 as the third child and second (but eldest surviving) daughter of Leopold V, Archduke of Further Austria and Count of Tyrol and his wife Claudia de' Medici. Her grandparents on her father's side were Charles II, Archduke of Inner Austria and his wife Princess Maria Anna of Bavaria. Her grandparents on her mother's side were Ferdinando I de' Medici, Grand Duke of Tuscany and his wife Princess Christina of Lorraine.

From her mother's first marriage, she had an older half-sister, Vittoria della Rovere, Duchess of Rovere and Montefeltro suo jure and later Grand Duchess consort of Tuscany. Of her four surviving full siblings, her sister Maria Leopoldine was briefly Holy Roman Empress, German Queen, Queen consort of Hungary and Bohemia until her death in childbirth in 1649. Her two brothers Ferdinand Charles and Sigismund Francis were the last male members of their branch who ruled Further Austria and the County of Tyrol.

=== Duchess of Mantua ===
On 7 August 1649, the marriage contract between Isabella Clara and Charles II Gonzaga, Duke of Mantua and heir of the Duchy of Montferrat, was signed at Innsbruck. Considering the size of the bride's dowry, the contract stipulated that all the revenues of the Gazzuolo district must be given to her. The official wedding between them was solemnized three months later, on 7 November (Note: Other sources dated the marriage ceremony on 13 June 1649. Ersch 1862, p. 161.) in Mantua. Thanks to this alliance with the House of Habsburg, Charles II was able to remove the French from Casale and then agreed with King Louis XIV of France that Spain should not control the Duchy of Montferrat; rather, it would remain with the Gonzaga family.

Charles' mother Maria Gonzaga, Duchess of Montferrat and former Regent of the Duchy of Mantua, who was an adherent of a pro-Austrian foreign policy, and her paternal aunt Eleonora Gonzaga, Dowager Holy Roman Empress organized the union. In March 1651, together with her husband and mother-in-law, Isabella Clara accompanied her sister-in-law, Eleonora Gonzaga, for her wedding with Ferdinand III, Holy Roman Emperor in Wiener Neustadt. They remained in the Imperial court until May, when they returned to Mantua.

In Revere on 31 August 1652, Isabella Clara gave birth to her only child, Ferdinand Charles, the future and last Duke of Mantua and Montferrat of the House of Gonzaga; however, this didn't help the couple overcome their differences. Charles II was indifferent to his wife—whom he married purely for political reasons—and had a long-standing relationship with the Countess Margherita della Rovere, also living at Casale with della Rovere openly. Isabella Clara, with the help of Pope Alexander VII, expelled her husband's mistress to Rome; but this didn't stop the hypersexuality of Charles II, who continued taking lovers, both male and female.

Isabella Clara soon tired of her husband's behaviors and, in spite of her mother-in-law's requests that she be prudent, Isabella Clara also took a lover, Count Charles Bulgarini, a secretary of the Duke and a baptised Jew from the Mantua ghetto. Their relationship was kept secret initially, but the affair became well-known in time. Consequently, Isabella Clara suffered the rejection of and contempt from the ducal court. In June 1661, an assassination attempt was made against the Count Bulgarini, but the shot killed his father. In 1660, after the death of her mother-in-law, Isabella Clara also took the title of Duchess of Montferrat. When Charles II died suddenly on 14 August 1665, there were rumors that his wife ordered that he would be poisoned. In fact, the Duke died either accidentally after drinking an aphrodisiac, or in the midst of lascivious intercourse.

=== Regency ===
During her husband's life, Isabella Clara relied on the advice of her lover and controlled the political situation in the duchy. When she became regent on behalf of her minor son, she appointed Count Bulgarini as her First Minister and took a neutral position between the Spanish and French kingdoms and also kept a cautious policy to ensure that Mantua and Montferrat would become independent from the Holy Roman Empire.

In November 1666, she received the ducal investiture from the Holy Roman Emperor on her son's behalf, which confirmed his ownership over the fiefs of Reggiolo and Luzzara that the Dukes of Guastalla had controlled since 1631. During her regency, Isabella Clara increased the Duchy of Mantua's territory, strengthening its defenses. Under the mediation of Luis de Guzmán Ponce de Leon, governor of Duchy of Milan, she also obtained several islands in the Po river without hostility; these were also claimed by the Duchy of Modena and Reggio. In addition, Count Bulgarini used his position to improve the economic situation of the state with several tax, judicial and law enforcement systems and the quality of life of the local population.

=== Imprisonment and death ===
In August 1669, the Dowager Duchess ended her regency and transferred all of her powers to her son. However, due to the dissolute behavior of the young duke, she had to continue participating in the affairs of the state. In August 1670, at Goito, Isabella Clara entered into a marriage contract with Ferrante III Gonzaga, Duke of Guastalla, under which their children Ferdinand Charles and Anna Isabella would marry one another. Under this contract, Ferrante III named his daughter and son-in-law joint heirs of the Duchy of Guastalla and the Dosolo, Luzzara and Reggiolo regions. Additionally, the Dowager Duchess obtained the approval of the Emperor that, after the death of Ferrante III (who had no surviving male heirs), the Duchy of Guastalla would be passed to her son, as his wife's inheritance, successfully.

After the official wedding ceremony of her son with the Guastalla heiress in July 1671, Isabella Clara retired from court and moved to Goito Castle, where she lived with Count Bulgarini, whom she married secretly shortly thereafter. This may have been why, on 16 December 1671, Leopold I, Holy Roman Emperor imprisoned Isabella Clara in an Ursuline monastery and Count Bulgarini in a Dominican monastery, both having been imprisoned with the consent of the Pope. At the request of the Imperial Commissioner, Count Gottlieb von Windisch-Graetz, both Isabella Clara and Count Bulgarini took monastic vows. The Dowager Duchess became a Poor Clare nun.

Isabella Clara died on 24 February 1685 in the Ursuline monastery in Mantua. Only her son attended her funeral and she was buried in the Church of Sant'Orsola. Her public memorial service took place on 14 May in the Basilica palatina di Santa Barbara.

== Ancestors ==
Ancestors of Archduchess Isabella Clara of Austria

16. Philip the Handsome, King of Castile
8. Ferdinand I, Holy Roman Emperor (= 22)
17. Joanna of Castile
4. Charles II, Archduke of Austria
18. Vladislas II of Bohemia and Hungary
9. Anna of Bohemia and Hungary (= 23)
19. Anna of Foix-Candale
2. Leopold V, Archduke of Austria
20. William IV, Duke of Bavaria
10. Albert V, Duke of Bavaria
21. Marie of Baden-Sponheim
5. Maria Anna of Bavaria
22. Ferdinand I, Holy Roman Emperor (= 8)
11. Anna of Austria
23. Anna of Bohemia and Hungary (= 9)
1. Archduchess Isabella Clara of Austria
24. Giovanni dalle Bande Nere
12. Cosimo I de' Medici, Grand Duke of Tuscany
25. Maria Salviati
6. Ferdinando I de' Medici, Grand Duke of Tuscany
26. Pedro Álvarez de Toledo, Marquis of Villafranca
13. Eleanor de Toledo
27. Maria Osorio, 2nd Marquise of Villafranca
3. Claudia de' Medici
28. Francis I, Duke of Lorraine
14. Charles III, Duke of Lorraine
29. Christina of Denmark
7. Christina of Lorraine
30. Henry II of France
15. Claude of Valois
31. Catherine de' Medici

== Bibliography ==
- 1665–1669 Isabella Clara d'Austria, reggenza per il figlio Ferdinando Carlo in: catalogo-mantova.lamoneta.it [retrieved 4 December 2016]
- Ersch, Johann Samuel (2012) [1862]. Allgemeine encyclopädie der wissenschaften und künste in alphabetischer folge von genannten schrifts bearbeitet und herausgegeben (in German). Leipzig: Gleditsch. p. 161, 163, 188.
- Wurzbach, C. von (2012) [1860]. "Habsburg, Elisabeth auch Isabella Clara von Oesterreich". Biographisches Lexikon des Kaisertums Österreich (in German). Austria: Austrian Literature Online, University of Innsbruck. p. 178.
