= Ferdinando Carlo Gonzaga =

Duke of Mantua and Montferrat from 1665 to 1708

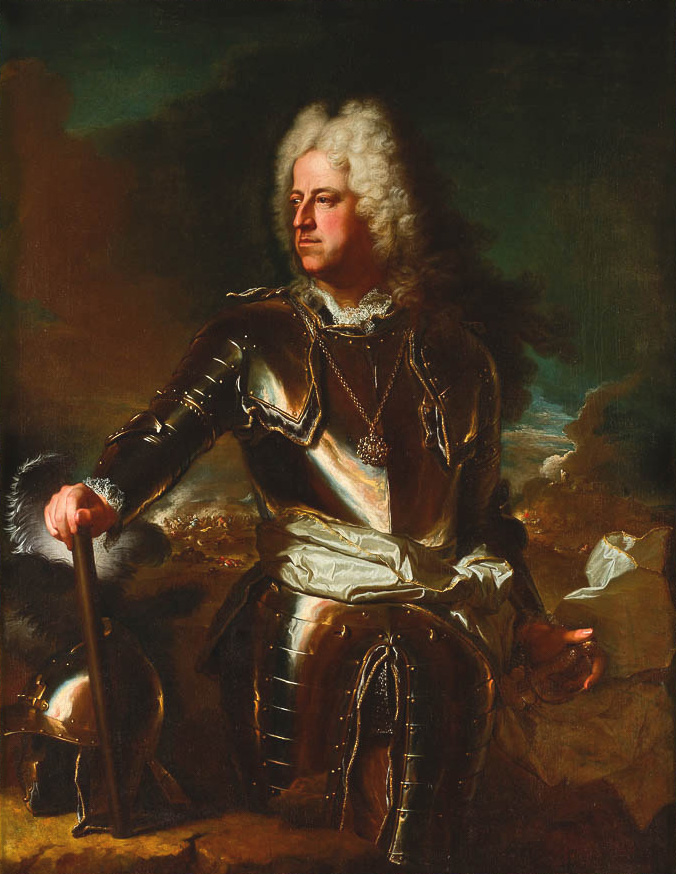
- Portrait by Hyacinthe Rigaud c. 1706

Duke of Mantua and Montferrat Duke of Guastalla
- Reign: 14 August 1665 – 5 July 1708; January 11 1678 – 1692 (in Guastalla)
- Predecessor: Charles II Gonzaga; Ferrante III Gonzaga (in Guastalla)
- Successor: Charles VI Habsburg (in Mantua); Victor Amadeus II of Savoy (in Montferrat); Vincenzo Gonzaga (in Guastalla)
- Born: 31 August 1652; Revere, Duchy of Mantua
- Died: 5 July 1708 (aged 55); Padua, Republic of Venice
- Burial: Basilica palatina di Santa Barbara
- Spouse: Anna Isabella Gonzaga; Suzanne Henriette of Lorraine
- House: Gonzaga
- Father: Charles II Gonzaga
- Mother: Archduchess Isabella Clara of Austria

Ferdinando Carlo Gonzaga (31 August 1652 – 5 July 1708) was the only child of Duke Charles II of Mantua and Montferrat, and the last ruler of the Duchy of Mantua of the House of Gonzaga. He was disposessed of his duchies by an Imperial ban in 1708 after supporting France during the War of the Spanish Succession.

== Biography ==
Born in Revere in 1652, at the age of 13 Ferdinand Charles received the imperial investiture on the Duchy of Mantua with the ceremony of Coronation at the Cathedral of St. Peter in 1665. The first act of the government of the Duke was to try to curb the abuses that occurred in the collection of court fees. At the same time, reforms of public order of the Duchy were implemented. Although Ferdinando Carlo was intelligent and a great lover of music (in 1700 the composer Tomaso Albinoni dedicated his second opera to Ferdinando Carlo), he proved more inclined to women and charitable works than the running of the governments of the duchies of Mantua and Monferrato.

Ferdinando Carlo first married Anna Isabella Gonzaga (d. 11 August 1703), daughter of Ferrante III Gonzaga, sovereign Duke of Guastalla. This marriage was arranged by the assistance of his aunt, empress dowager Eleanor Gonzaga, and took place in 1671. Anna Isabella Gonzaga was the heir of the Duchy of Guastalla and Luzzara, and her rights transferred these areas, which had long been a source of conflict between the two Gonzaga lines, to the Mantua line of the Gonzaga dynasty. During the years of the government of the Duke Ferdinando Carlo, the duchy of Mantua had a period of development and autonomy in respect of the Empire. This aroused the suspicions of the Spain which, fearing the strengthening of the small state of Mantua, decided to suspend payment of the annual contribution of 50,000 crowns to a garrison of Casale, thus provoking the wrath of the Duke of Mantua.

Frustrated by the Austrians in the conquest of Guastalla, Ferdinando Carlo concluded a pact with Louis XIV of France on 8 December 1678, selling Casale. In this context his minister, Count Ercole Antonio Mattioli, might have become the Man in the Iron Mask, being imprisoned in Pinerolo since April 1679 for disclosing this pact to the enemies of France.

The duke denied everything, but concluded a new pact with the French in 1681, obtaining thereby a yearly pension of sixty thousand lire, a career as an army general, and a part in any future French conquests in Italy. The French occupied Casale on 29 September 1681 and the Duke of Mantua lost respect in Italy as a consequence.

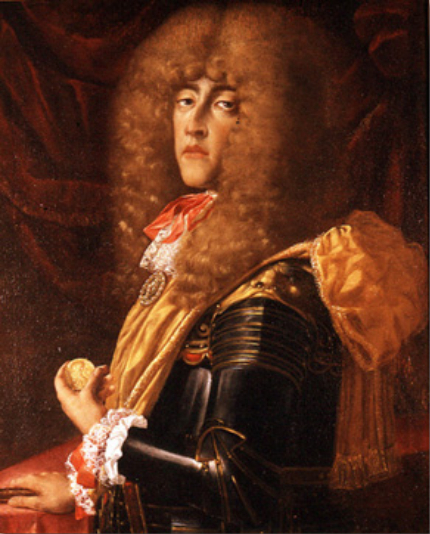
Portrait of Ferdinando Carlo Gonzaga, attributed to Frans Geffels, c. 1671

Although the Lorraine-Elbeufs were reckoned among the princes étrangers at the court of France, as a cadet branch (Elbeuf) of a non-reigning cadet branch (Guise) of the House of Lorraine, it was not their custom to marry crowned heads. Nevertheless, following the death of his first wife, Ferdinando sought a new wife and he became enamored with Louise Bernardine de Durfort, the daughter of Jacques Henri de Durfort, 1st Duke of Duras, after seeing her portrait. He made his interest known to the king who approved of his courtship of the young woman. She was still in mourning for her husband, the Duke de Lesdigueres, and resisted Ferdinando's attempts to woo her, having heard his health was bad and not wanting to live in Italy. Ferdinando's pursuit of the widow persisted until she went to the king and begged to not have to marry him.

His support and hope for marriage lost, he instead married Suzanne Henriette de Lorraine in pursuit of an heir and a dynastic alliance with another reigning ducal house under French influence. She was the daughter of Charles de Lorraine, Duke d'Elbeuf by his third wife, Françoise de Montault de Navailles, daughter of Philippe de Montault, Duke de Navailles. Duke Ferdinando Carlo married Mademoiselle d'Elbeuf in Milan on 8 November 1704. To the French, her husband was known as Charles de Gonzague. This marriage was childless.

Ferdinando Carlo again chose the French side in the War of the Spanish Succession. In 1701, when the anti-French coalition forces conquered Mantua, he fled to Casale, leaving his consort Anna Isabella Gonzaga behind as regent during his absence. He paid heavily for his choice when the French were chased back over the Alps in 1706. After the death of Duchess of Mantua, Ferdinando Carlo Gonzaga appointed Ascanio Andreasi as Prime Minister, thus constituting the state act of the duke, with the task of stabilising the Mantuan state during the war. Placed under the Imperial ban in 1701 by Leopold I, Holy Roman Emperor, this was confirmed by the Diet of Regensburg, 30 June 1708, and all his possessions were confiscated.

The House of Savoy obtained the remaining half of Montferrat, having already conquered the first half in the War of the Mantuan Succession in 1631. The Duchy of Mantua was thereafter administered by Austria and ceased its independent existence. Ferdinando Carlo died the same year in Padua.

== Ancestry ==
Ancestors of Ferdinando Carlo Gonzaga

8. Charles Gonzaga, Duke of Mantua and Montferrat
4. Charles Gonzaga, Duke of Nevers
9. Catherine of Mayenne-Lorraine
2. Charles II Gonzaga, Duke of Mantua and Montferrat
10. Francesco IV Gonzaga, Duke of Mantua
5. Maria Gonzaga
11. Princess Margaret of Savoy
1. Ferdinando Carlo Gonzaga, Duke of Mantua and Montferrat
12. Archduke Charles of Austria, Archduke of Further Austria
6. Archduke Leopold of Austria, Archduke of Further Austria
13. Duchess Maria Anna of Bavaria
3. Archduchess Isabella Clara of Austria
14. Ferdinando I de' Medici, Grand Duke of Tuscany
7. Claudia de' Medici
15. Princess Christina of Lorraine

== Bibliography ==
- Alessandro Cont, Sotto tutela: il sovrano bambino in Italia (1659–1714), “Rivista storica italiana”, 124, 2 (agosto 2012), pp. 537–581,
- F. Amadei, Cronaca universale della città di Mantova. Volume IV, Mantova, 1954.

Regnal titles
Preceded by Charles II of Mantua-Montferrat	Duke of Mantua; 1665–1708	Succeeded by Emperor Charles VI
Preceded by Charles II of Mantua-Montferrat	Duke of Montferrat; 1665–1708	Succeeded by Victor Amadeus II of Sardinia
