= Charles II Gonzaga of Nevers =

17th Century Duke of Nevers

Charles II Gonzaga, Duke of Nevers
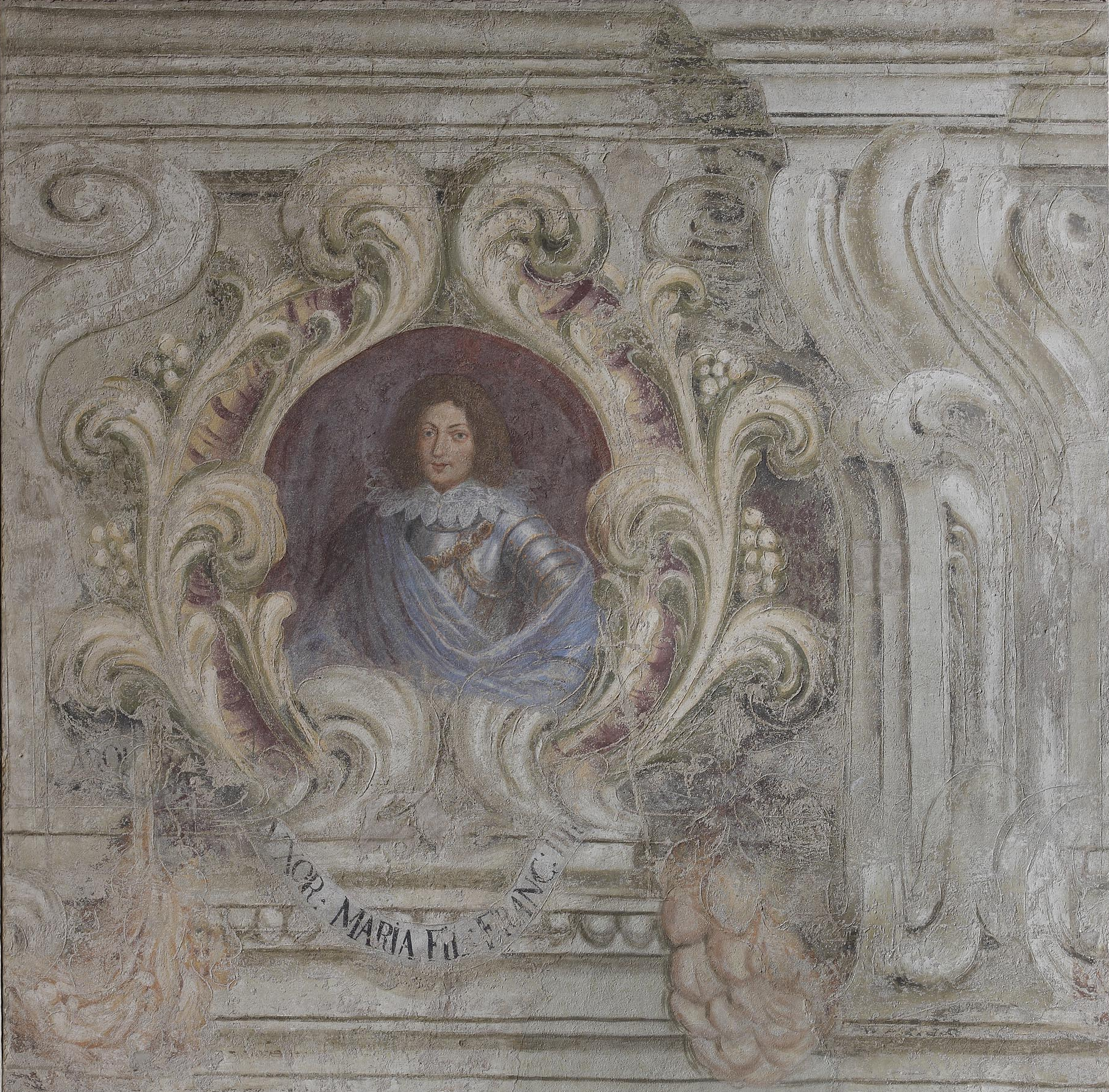
- Portrait of Carlo di Gonzaga-Rethel by Antonio Calabrò
- Born: 22 October 1609
- Died: 30 August 1631 (aged 21); Cavriana
- Noble family: Gonzaga
- Spouse: Maria Gonzaga, Marquise of Montferrat (m. 1627)
- Issue: Maria Gonzaga; Charles II, Duke of Mantua and Montferrat; Eleonora, Holy Roman Empress
- Father: Charles I, Duke of Mantua
- Mother: Catherine de Lorraine-Guise-Mayenne

Charles II Gonzaga (22 October 1609 – 30 August 1631) was the son of Charles I, Duke of Mantua, and Catherine de Lorraine-Guise (also known as Catherine de Mayenne). He was the Duke of Nevers and Rethel, together with his father.

== Biography ==
In 1621, he succeeded his uncle Henri de Lorraine-Guise as Duke of Mayenne. In 1627 he married his cousin Maria Gonzaga, Marquise of Montferrat and heiress to the Duchy of Mantua. However, Cesare II Gonzaga, Duke of Guastalla and Emperor Ferdinand II rejected her claim to Mantua, leading to the War of Mantuan Succession (1628–1631).

Charles, who predeceased his father, never held the title, Duke of Mantua. When the latter died in 1637, Charles's eight-year-old son, Charles II, became Duke of Mantua, his widow Maria acting as regent. His daughter Eleonora became Holy Roman Empress.

== Family ==
In December 1627, Charles married his cousin Maria Gonzaga, the marriage being arranged by her uncle, Vincenzo II Gonzaga.

Charles and Maria had:

- Maria Gonzaga
- Charles II, Duke of Mantua and Montferrat (1629–1665).
- Eleonora (1630–1686), who married in 1651 Ferdinand III, Holy Roman Emperor.

== Sources ==
- Bourne, Molly (2016). "From court to cloister and back again: Margherita Gonzaga, Caterina dé Medici and Lucrina Fetti at the convent of Sant'Orsola in Mantua". In Cavallo, Sandra; Evangelisti, Silvia (eds.). Domestic Institutional Interiors in Early Modern Europe. Routledge. p. 153-180.
- Redondo, Maria Concepcion Gutierrez (2021). "Splendid Women in the Diplomacy of Juan Antonio de Vera (1583-1658), Ambassador of the Catholic King Philip IV". In Santaliestra, Laura Oliván; Anderson, Roberta; Suner, Suna (eds.). Gender and Diplomacy: Women and Men in European Embassies from the 15th to the 18th Century. pp. 3–20. ISBN 9783990128350.
- Sanders, Donald C. (2012). Music at the Gonzaga Court in Mantua. Lexington Books.
- Ward, A.W.; Prothero, G.W.; Leathes, Stanley, eds. (1934). The Cambridge Modern History. Vol. XIII. Cambridge University Press.

Preceded by Henry of Lorraine	Duc de Mayenne; 1621–1631	Succeeded by Ferdinand Gonzaga
