= 1636 imperial election =

Holy Roman imperial election

- 22 December 1636

7 Prince-electors 4 votes needed to win
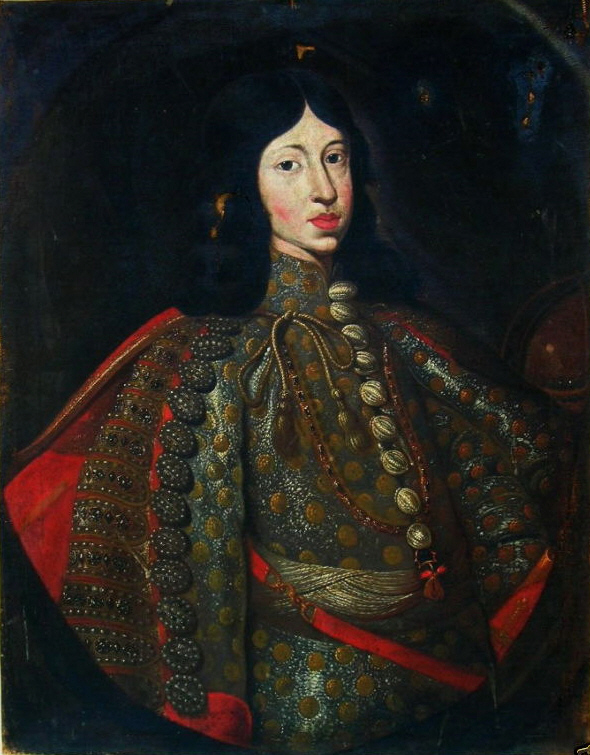
Candidate	Ferdinand III
House	Habsburg
Electoral vote	7
Percentage	100%
Emperor before election
Ferdinand II
House of Habsburg
Elected Emperor (Note: Ferdinand was elected as King of the Romans to act as Ferdinand II's designated successor and co-ruler. He became Emperor upon his father's death in 1637.)
Ferdinand III
House of Habsburg

The imperial election of 1636 was an imperial election held to select the emperor of the Holy Roman Empire. It took place in Regensburg on December 22.

== Background ==
This was the sixth imperial election to take place during the Reformation. On 31 October 1517 Martin Luther, a professor of moral theology at the University of Wittenberg, now part of the Martin Luther University of Halle-Wittenberg, had delivered the Ninety-five Theses to Albert of Brandenburg, the elector of Mainz. This list of propositions criticized the practice of selling indulgences, remissions of the punishment meted out for sin in Purgatory. Luther's criticism snowballed into a massive schism in the church, and from there into a split among the states of the empire.

The accession of the fiercely Catholic Ferdinand II, Holy Roman Emperor as king of Bohemia led to unrest among the Protestant estates of the kingdom. On 23 May 1618 a group of members of the Protestant estates threw two of Ferdinand II's representatives from the third story of Prague Castle in an event known as the Defenestration of Prague. On 28 August 1619 the full Bohemian estates declared Ferdinand II deposed. They offered the throne to Frederick V, elector Palatine, who accepted.

Ferdinand II called on Maximilian I, duke of Bavaria and leader of the Catholic League, a political confederation-cum-military alliance, for help suppressing the Bohemian Revolt and removing Frederick. In a treaty of 21 October, he promised the Upper Palatinate and its electoral rights in exchange for this help. At the Diet of Regensburg on 25 February 1623 the Duchy of Bavaria received the Palatine electoral dignity, to be returned on Maximilian's death.

On 30 May 1635 the Peace of Prague was signed, ending the conflict between the Holy Roman Empire and its Protestant states. However, the larger war in Germany, the Thirty Years' War, which involved other great powers in Europe, continued.

Ferdinand II called for the election of his successor. In addition to Maximilian, the electors called to Regensburg were:

- Anselm Casimir Wambold von Umstadt, elector of Mainz
- Philipp Christoph von Sötern, elector of Trier
- Ferdinand of Bavaria, elector of Cologne
- Ferdinand III, Holy Roman Emperor, king of Bohemia
- John George I, elector of Saxony
- George William, elector of Brandenburg

Of these, only the elector of Saxony was Lutheran and only the elector of Brandenburg was Calvinist.

== Election results ==
Ferdinand III, Ferdinand II's eldest son, was elected king of the Romans.

Elector	Electorate	Vote
Ferdinand of Bavaria	Cologne	Ferdinand III
Philipp Christoph von Sötern	Trier	Ferdinand III
Maximilian I	Bavaria	Ferdinand III
Maximilian I	Palatinate	Ferdinand III
John George I	Saxony	Ferdinand III
George William	Brandenburg	Ferdinand III
Anselm Casimir Wambold von Umstadt	Mainz	Ferdinand III
Ferdinand III	Bohemia	Ferdinand III (voted for himself)
Total		8 votes, 100% (unanimous)

== Aftermath ==
Ferdinand III acceded to the throne on his father's death on 15 February 1637 and was crowned on 18 November.
