= Anna Isabella Gonzaga =

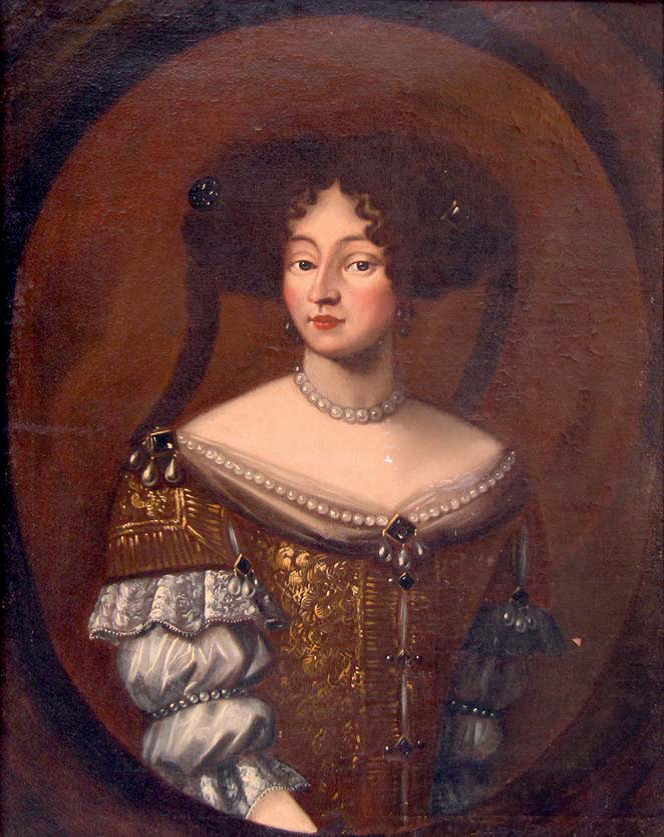

Duchess consort of Mantua and Montferrat
- Tenure: 1671–1703
- Born: 12 February 1655; Italy
- Died: 11 August 1703 (aged 48); Guastalla, Italy
- Burial: San Maurizio, Mantua
- Spouse: Ferdinando Carlo Gonzaga, Duke of Mantua and Montferrat (m. 1671)
- House: Gonzaga
- Father: Ferrante III Gonzaga, Duke of Guastalla
- Mother: Margherita d'Este

Anna Isabella Gonzaga (12 February 1655 – 11 August 1703) was a Duchess consort of Mantua and Montferrat and heiress of the Duchy of Guastalla, including Luzzara and Reggiolo; she married in 1671 to Ferdinando Carlo Gonzaga, Duke of Mantua and Montferrat, as his first wife. She was the regent of Mantua in the absence of her spouse in 1691-1692 and during the War of the Spanish Succession in 1702–1703.

== Life ==
Born into the House of Gonzaga, Anna Isabella Gonzaga was the daughter of Ferrante III Gonzaga, Duke of Guastalla and his wife, Princess Margherita d'Este (1619–1692), daughter of Alfonso III d'Este, Duke of Modena.

As the eldest of two daughters, she was the heir of the Duchy of Guastalla and Luzzara Reggiolo, areas which had long been a source of conflict between the two Gonzaga lines: the Gonzagas of Guastalla and the Gonzagas of Mantua. In 1671, she was married to Ferdinando Carlo Gonzaga. Her aunt arranged the marriage, and the empress dowager Eleanor Gonzaga united the two Gonzaga lines. The marriage was childless.

In 1678, her father died, and her rights to Guastalla were challenged by Don Vincenzo Gonzaga, who married her sister, Princess Anna Maria Vittoria (1659–1707), and proclaimed himself Duke of Guastalla. Mantua protested, after which Spain intervened and threatened Mantua. In 1691, Spain attacked Mantua, and Ferdinando fled to Venice with his ministers. In his absence, Anna Isabella served as regent, assisted by the Imperial representative Marquis degli Obizzi and some advisers. She managed to calm the frightened public and successfully arranged for the defense of Mantua against Spain. She also successfully handled peace negotiations with Spain between the Spanish governor in Milan and the viceroy of Naples, which was concluded in 1692.

In 1702, during the War of the Spanish Succession, Imperiali attacked the Duchy of Mantua, who wished to conquer the areas of Luzzara and Cocoon. Duke Ferdinando Carlo fled and left Anna Isabella to handle the situation as regent. During her second regency, she was assisted by Mr de Liesse. She appointed commanders to handle the defense of Luzzara and Cocoon and issued negotiations for Sabbioneta's foreign protection.

== Ancestry ==
Ancestors of Anna Isabella Gonzaga

16. Cesare I Gonzaga, Count of Guastalla
8. Ferrante II Gonzaga, Duke of Guastalla
17. Camilla Borromeo
4. Cesare II Gonzaga, Duke of Guastalla
18. Giannettino Doria
9. Vittoria Doria
19. Ginetta Centurione
2. Ferrante III Gonzaga, Duke of Guastalla
20. Paolo Giordano I Orsini, Duke of Bracciano
10. Virginio Orsini, Duke of Bracciano
21. Isabella de' Medici
5. Isabella Orsini
22. Fabio Damasceni
11. Flavia Damasceni Peretti
23. Maria Felice Mignucci Peretti
1. Anna Isabella Gonzaga
24. Alfonso I d'Este, Marquis of Montecchio
12. Cesare d'Este, Duke of Modena
25. Giulia della Rovere
6. Alfonso III d'Este, Duke of Modena
26. Cosimo I de' Medici, Grand Duke of Tuscany
13. Virginia de' Medici
27. Camilla Martelli
3. Margherita d'Este
28. Emmanuel Philibert, Duke of Savoy
14. Charles Emmanuel I, Duke of Savoy
29. Margaret of France, Duchess of Berry
7. Isabella of Savoy
30. Philip II of Spain
15. Infanta Catalina Micaela of Spain
31. Elisabeth of Valois
