= Frans Luycx =

Flemish painter (c. 1604–1668)

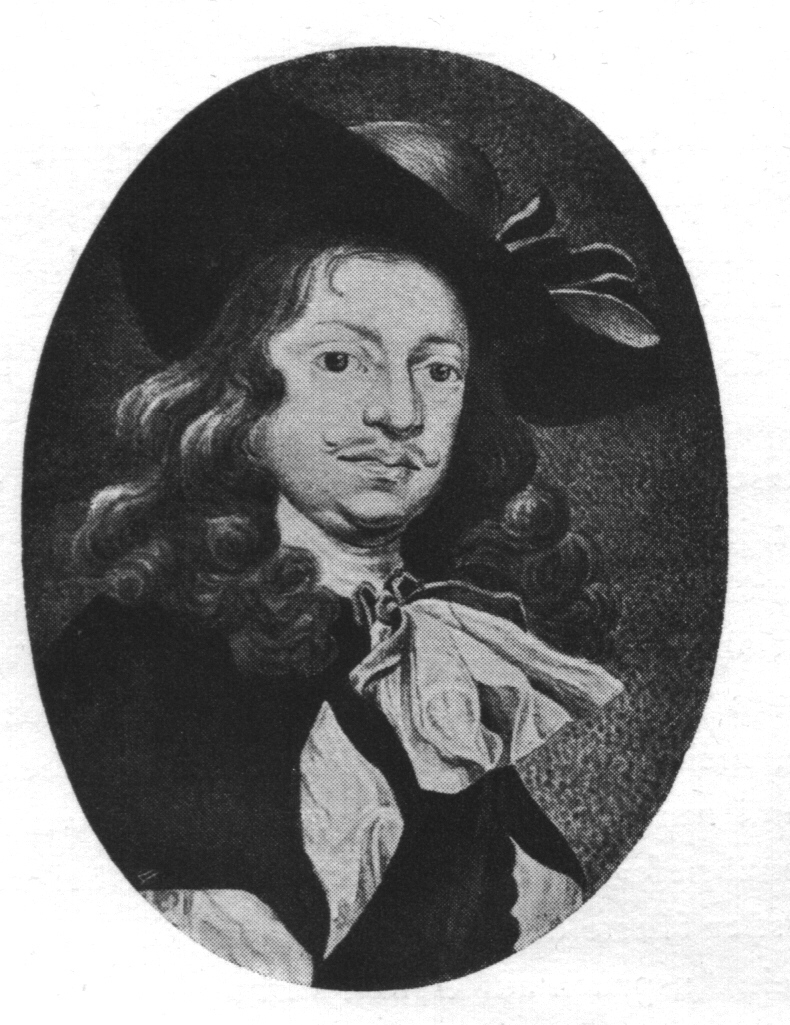
- Self-Portrait
- Born: before 17 April 1604; Antwerp, Brabant, Spain
- Died: 1 May 1668 (aged 63–64); Vienna, Austria

Frans Luycx or Frans Luyckx (Dutch pronunciation: [frɑns lœyk(s)]; before 17 April 1604 – 1 May 1668) was a Flemish painter who became the leading portrait painter at the imperial court of Emperor Ferdinand III in Vienna. He is best known for his portraits of the Emperor's family and various members of the Habsburgs, including its Austrian and Spanish branches.

== Life ==
Frans Luycx was baptized on 17 April 1604 in Antwerp Cathedral. His father, Adam Luycx, was a silk cloth merchant and his mother was Johanna (or Joanna) de Rasieres. In 1618, he became a pupil in the workshop of Remakel Sina (also known as Remacules Quina). He was admitted as a master in the Antwerp Guild of Saint Luke in 1620. He then joined the workshop of the leading Antwerp master Peter Paul Rubens.

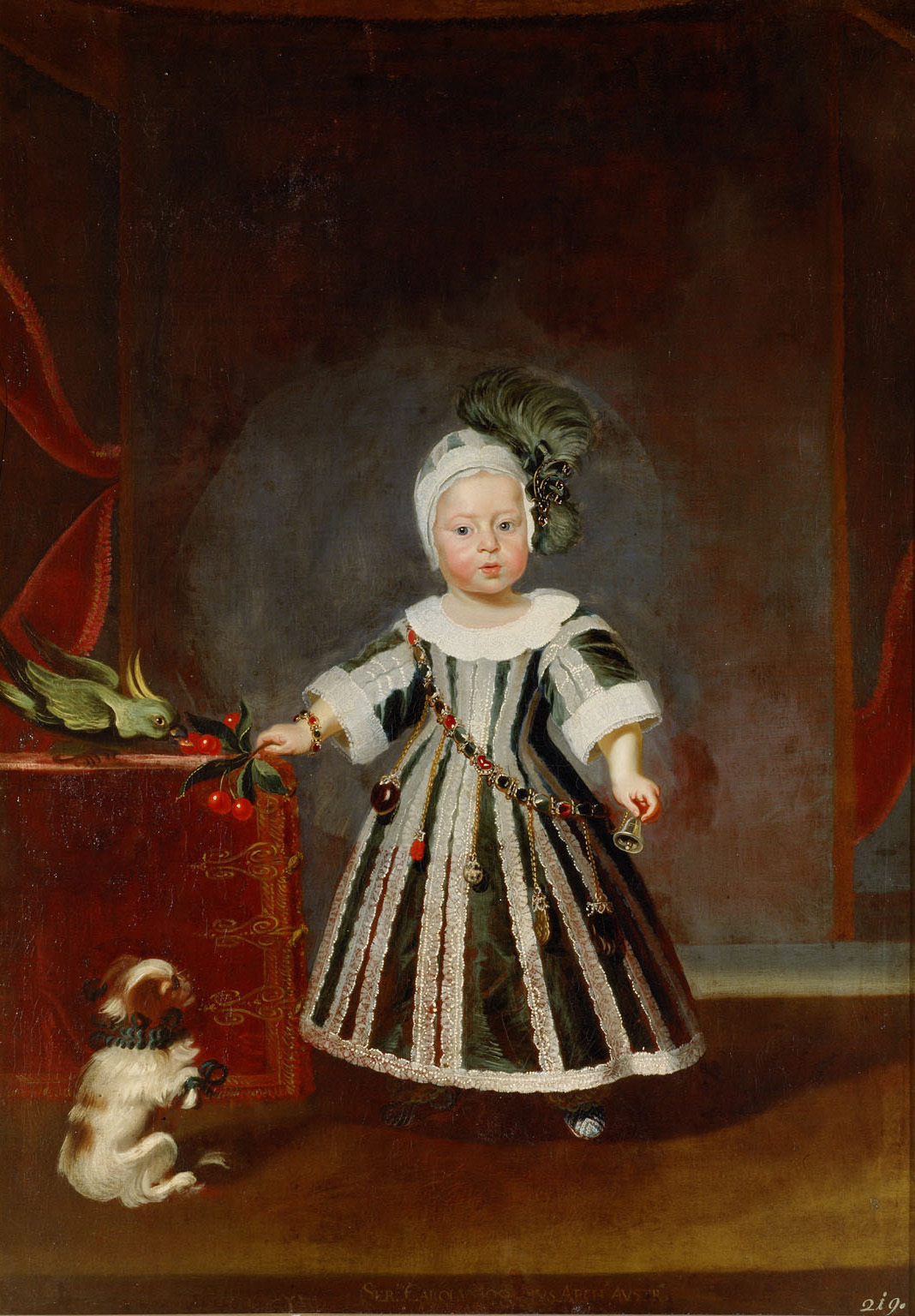
Archduke Karl Joseph with puppies and cockatoo at the age of one and a half

In 1635, Luycx was in Rome where he was able to establish contacts with the higher clerical circles and likely also with the Austrian branch of the House of Habsburg. His contacts with the Imperial family may also have been facilitated by his brother Gerhard who was a courtier at the Viennese court holding the position of 'bohmischer Kammerrat'. His younger brother Antonius was a high-ranking cleric at St. Stephen's Cathedral in Vienna as well as the teacher of Archduchess Mariana of Austria. From the beginning of 1638 he became the court painter of the newly appointed emperor Ferdinand III. He was paid a handsome salary and took up residence in Vienna.

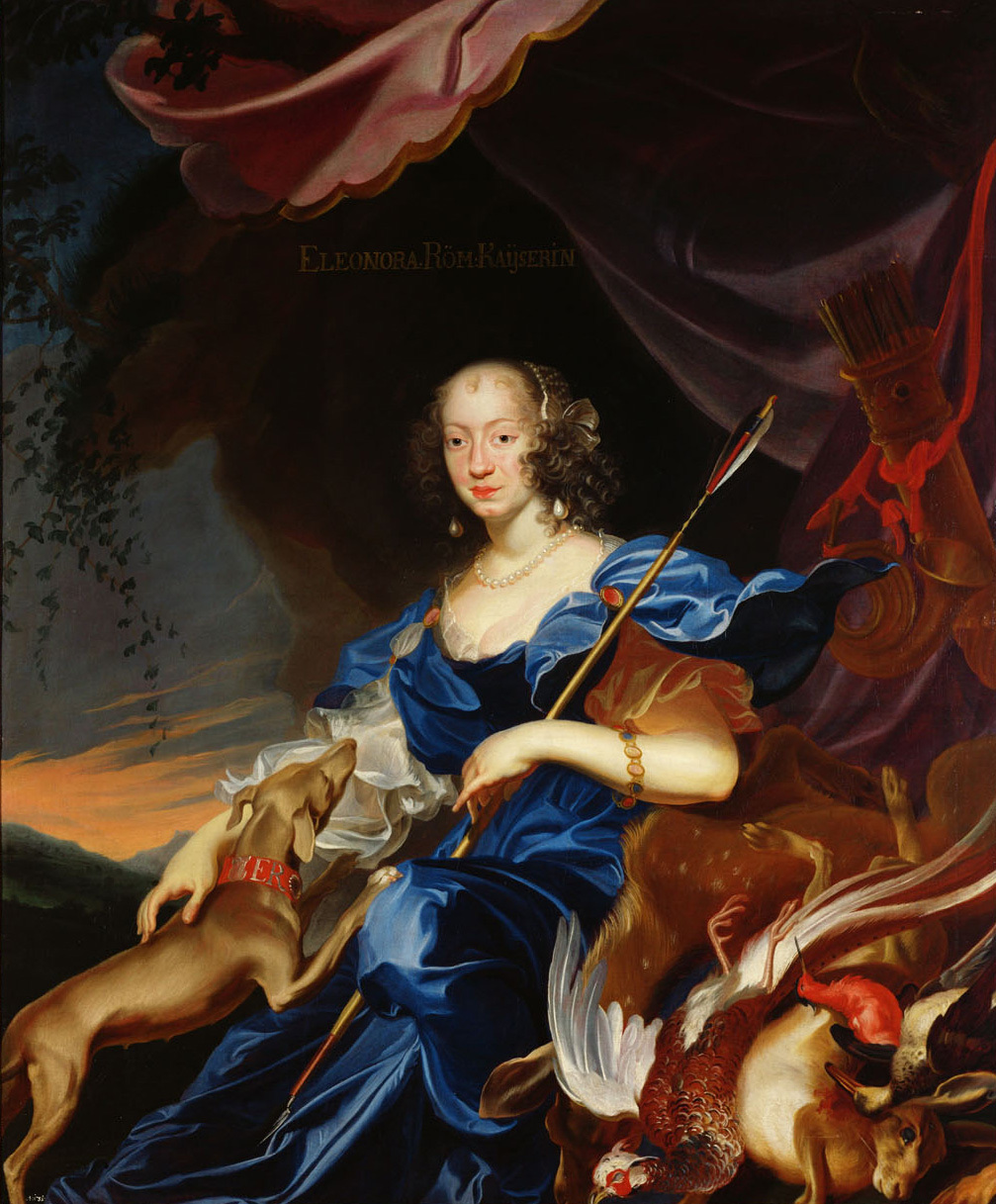
Eleonora Gonzaga as Diana, Holy Empress, 3rd wife of Ferdinand III

Luycx also had contacts with the court of the Polish–Lithuanian Commonwealth monarch, Władysław IV Vasa starting from 1637, as is confirmed in accounts preserved in Stockholm (his name being spelled as Luix). The Polish king probably visited the artist's atelier during his visit to Vienna in 1638. The 1640 settlement says about the payment by Polish agent in Vienna to "Leic, painter, for three effigies". Before 1643 Polish prince John Casimir Vasa availed himself of his services for the decoration of his residence in Nieporęt. Among the Polish court commissions are portraits of Władysław IV and his wife Cecilia Renata of Austria (Wilanów Palace in Warsaw, Museum of Art in Łódź, Kunsthistorisches Museum in Vienna and Alte Pinakothek in Munich) and a portrait of King Władysław the Elbow-high, probably one from a cycle, lost during World War II (Gemäldegalerie Alte Meister in Dresden).

It is possible that Luycx travelled in 1640. It is believed that he was ennobled, together with his two brothers, around 1642. Luycx was referred to as 'von Luxenstein' from that time onwards. Around 1643, he is recorded as having pupils or assistants in his workshop. In that year his first wife died. The next year he married 24-year old Eleanora Claurens who was likely the mother of his three children. A first son was born in 1645. His second wife died in childbirth in 1651.

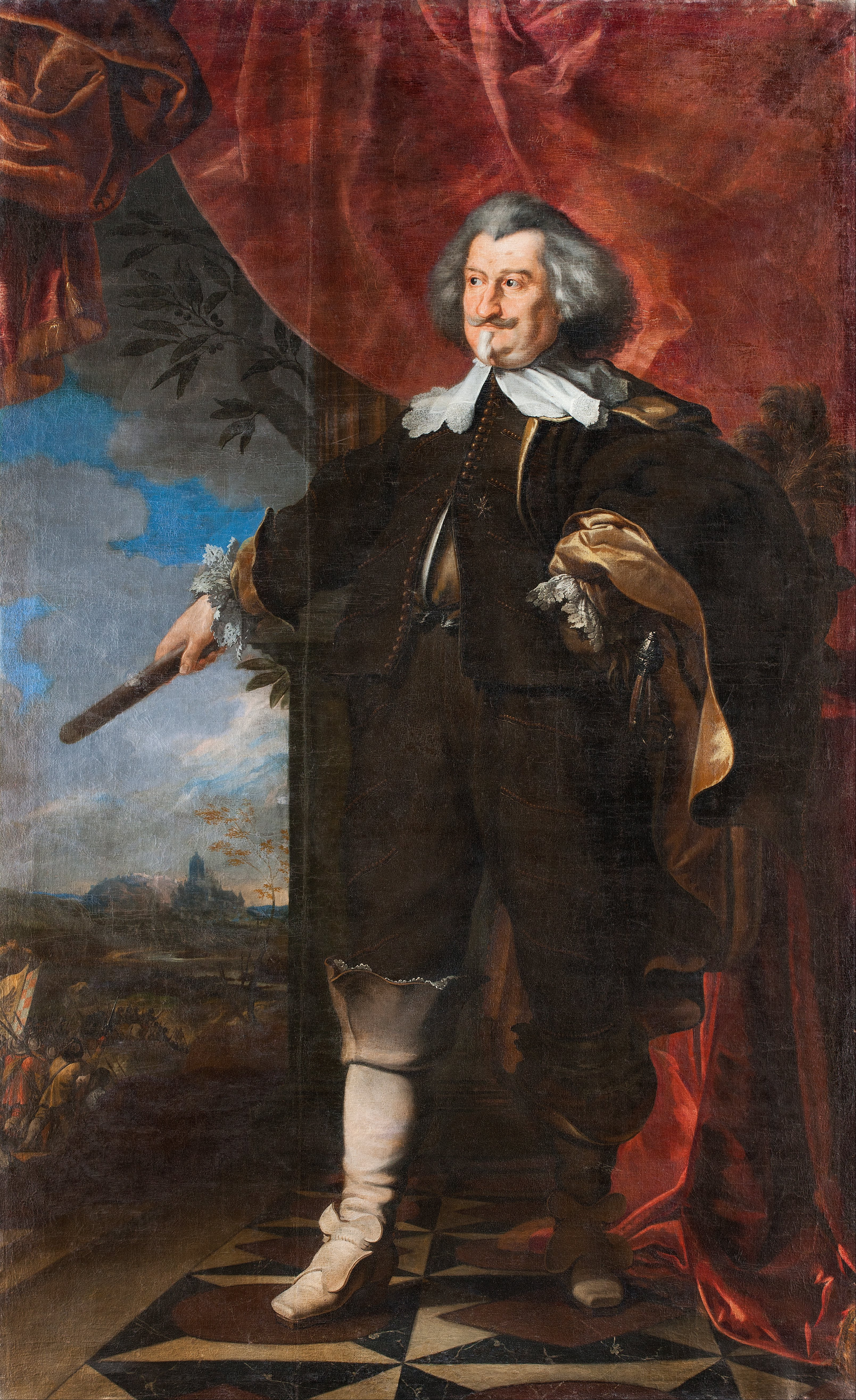
Portrait of Rudolf von Colloredo

In the period 1648–1650 Luycx likely travelled to the courts of the Electors to paint their portraits. In 1652 he traveled to his hometown Antwerp to obtain a certificate of legal birth and good behaviour. The next year he was back in Austria likely visiting Prague on his return trip. On 14 June 1654 Luycx married for the third time. His bride was called Eva Rosina Ottin. The couple received a wedding present from the Emperor. After the death of Emperor Ferdinand III, Luyckx was confirmed in his status as court painter. The new Emperor Leopold I, however, did not avail himself as much of Luyckx's services as the former Emperor.

Archduke Leopold Wilhelm of Austria who had returned to Austria after serving as Governor of the Spanish Netherlands from 1647 to 1656, became his patron. Luyckx accompanied the Archduke on his travels and stayed with him in Laibach after the Archduke had fallen ill from kidney stones.

The artist in his residence in Vienna died on 1 May 1668.

== Work ==
Frans Luycx started his career as a history painter. His early work focused on the depiction of history subjects and stories from the New Testament. In these works the influence of Rubens’ history paintings is evident. However, he abandoned these subjects soon after his first appointment as court painter. He established his reputation with his numerous portraits of the royal families and members of the courts of the Habsburgs, particularly in Vienna. These works played the same role as those of his compatriot and near contemporary Justus Sustermans in Florence. Unlike the latter, Luyckx was interested more in the quality of falling fabrics and draperies.

His work suffered quality loss through the incessant repetition of models that became stereotypical. His Viennese court style betrays Italian and Spanish influences. His compositions display a clear relationship with the portraits by Diego Velázquez. Luyckx used poses similar to those of Velázquez in some of his paintings; This is evidenced in the seven portraits by his hand in the Museo del Prado.
