= Margaret of Savoy, Vicereine of Portugal =

Margaret of Savoy
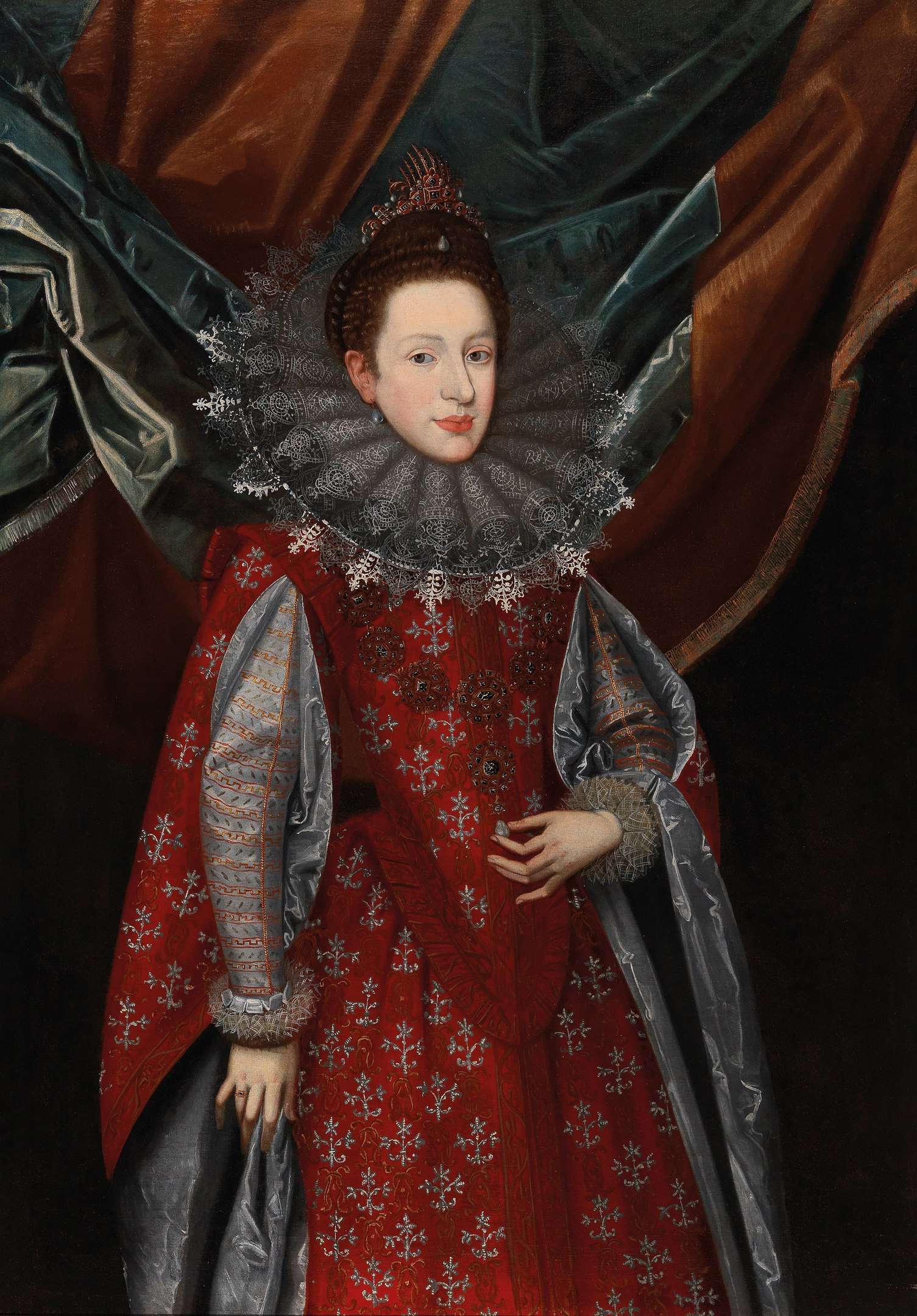
- Portrait by Jan Kraeck, 1607

Duchess consort of Mantua and Montferrat
- Tenure: 9 February 1612 – 22 December 1612

Vicereine of Portugal
- Tenure: 23 December 1634 – 1 December 1640
- Sovereign: Philip IV
- Predecessor: Diogo de Castro
- Born: 28 April 1589; Turin, Duchy of Savoy
- Died: 26 June 1655 (aged 66); Miranda de Ebro, Kingdom of Spain
- Burial: Abbey of Santa María la Real de Las Huelgas, Burgos
- Spouse: Francis IV, Duke of Mantua (m. 1608; died 1612)
- Issue: Maria Gonzaga, Duchess of Montferrat
- House: Savoy
- Father: Charles Emmanuel I, Duke of Savoy
- Mother: Catalina Micaela of Spain

Margaret of Savoy (28 April 1589 – 26 June 1655) was the last Habsburg Vicereine of Portugal from 1634 to 1640. In Portuguese she is known as Duquesa de Mântua, being by marriage the Duchess of Mantua and Montferrat. She was also regent of Montferrat during the minority of her daughter from 1612.

== Biography ==
=== Duchess of Montferrat ===
Margaret was born in Turin, as the fourth child and eldest daughter of Charles Emmanuel I, Duke of Savoy (1562–1630) and Infanta Catalina Micaela of Spain (1567–1597), the daughter of Philip II of Spain. She was married to the future Francis IV, Duke of Mantua (1586–1612) and Montferrat on 22 February 1608. The wedding was celebrated in Turin. In 1612 Margaret's husband succeeded his father, Vincent I, as Duke of Mantua. Their marriage produced three children, but only one daughter, Maria, survived childhood. Francis died in 1612.

=== Regent of Montferrat ===
As the couple had no surviving male issue, Duke Francis' brother Ferdinand succeeded him in the Duchy of Mantua, whereas in the Duchy of Montferrat he was succeeded by his three-year-old daughter Maria, because it had been historically inherited by females, as it was a margraviate of Aleramici origin following a different rule of succession. Indeed, it had been brought to the Mantuan princely dynasty (the House of Gonzaga) by the marriage of Margherita Paleologa, Margravine of Montferrat, in 1531. Accordingly, Maria's claims were asserted and Dowager Duchess Margaret required to be made her regent in Montferrat.

This was a contested inheritance - Maria was a minor for the next decade - and ultimately, Duke Francis' brothers failed to produce any legitimate issue, and the entire inheritance became subject to Mantuan War of Succession (1627–32).

Duchess Margaret's daughter Maria was in 1627 married to Charles of Gonzaga-Nevers, the eldest son of the distant Gonzaga heir-male (at that point Charles I, Duke of Mantua), in order to join two of the Mantuan claims. They had to wage war, but in the end their line prevailed and they commanded universal recognition as Dukes of Mantua and Montferrat.

=== Vicereine of Portugal ===
Since 1580, the kingdoms of Portugal and Spain had been forcefully joined together, or annexed, under the rule of Philip II of Spain. In an assembly known as the Cortes de Tomar, the Spanish monarch maintained the Portuguese kingdom in an Iberian dynastic union, separate from Spain, and promised some local rule through a viceroy, who was meant to have local ties either to Portugal or the Spanish royal family. Margaret had ancestral links to Portugal: two of her great-grandmothers, Empress Isabella and Beatrice, Duchess of Savoy, had been daughters of king Manuel I of Portugal.

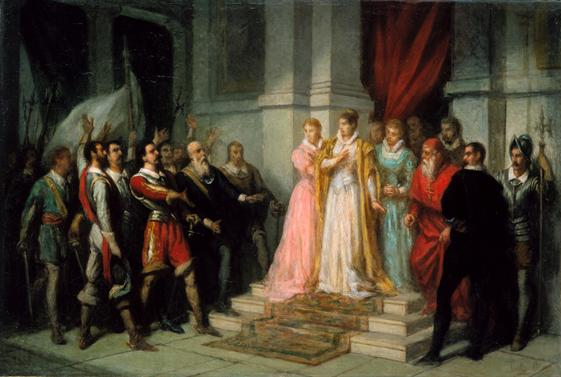
The Duchess of Mantua is arrested, following the Restoration of Independence.

After the death in 1635 of the then viceroy, the Count of Basto Diogo de Castro, who had ruled Portugal, Margaret's cousin, king Philip IV of Spain appointed Margaret as Vicereine of Portugal. She moved to Portugal in 1636. This nomination was the result of the efforts of Diogo Soares, member of the Council of Portugal at Madrid, a friend of the Count-Duke of Olivares and a relative of Miguel de Vasconcelos who, in 1635, would be named secretary of state of Portugal.

As a result of the Portuguese revolution (called the Restoration of Independence) of 1640, Vasconcelos was assassinated and the Duchess of Mantua tried to calm the Portuguese people during demonstrations in the Portuguese Terreiro do Paço (at the time Lisbon's main square). The Portuguese proclaimed the Duke of Braganza as their new king. Margaret was surrounded in her headquarters in Lisbon, and her support collapsing, the new potentate allowed her to depart to Spain.

She died in Miranda de Ebro in 1655, her daughter Duchess Maria of Rethel and Montferrat surviving her, with two grandchildren, of whom the daughter Eleanor had in 1651 become the Holy Roman Empress and the son Charles in 1637 the reigning duke of Mantua. At her death, both her grandchildren had already produced great-grandchildren for her.

== Issue ==
Margaret had three children:

- Maria (29 July 1609 – 14 August 1660); married Charles II Gonzaga, duke of Nevers, in 1627.
- Ludovico (21 April 1611 – 3 August 1612).
- Eleonora (12 September 1612 – 13 September 1612).

== Ancestors ==
Margaret of Savoy's ancestors in three generations
Margaret of Savoy	Father: Charles Emmanuel I, Duke of Savoy	Paternal Grandfather: Emmanuel Philibert, Duke of Savoy	Paternal Great-Grandfather: Charles III, Duke of Savoy
Margaret of Savoy	Father: Charles Emmanuel I, Duke of Savoy	Paternal Grandfather: Emmanuel Philibert, Duke of Savoy	Paternal Great-grandmother: Beatrice, Infanta of Portugal
Margaret of Savoy	Father: Charles Emmanuel I, Duke of Savoy	Paternal Grandmother: Margaret of France, Duchess of Berry	Paternal Great-Grandfather: Francis I of France
Margaret of Savoy	Father: Charles Emmanuel I, Duke of Savoy	Paternal Grandmother: Margaret of France, Duchess of Berry	Paternal Great-Grandmother: Claude of France
Margaret of Savoy	Mother: Catherine Michelle of Spain	Maternal Grandfather: Philip II of Spain	Maternal Great-Grandfather: Charles V, Holy Roman Emperor
Margaret of Savoy	Mother: Catherine Michelle of Spain	Maternal Grandfather: Philip II of Spain	Maternal Great-Grandmother: Isabella of Portugal
Margaret of Savoy	Mother: Catherine Michelle of Spain	Maternal Grandmother: Elisabeth of Valois	Maternal Great-grandfather: Henry II of France
Margaret of Savoy	Mother: Catherine Michelle of Spain	Maternal Grandmother: Elisabeth of Valois	Maternal Great-Grandmother: Catherine de' Medici

== Sources ==
- Raviola, Blythe Alice (2016). "The Three Lives of Margherita of Savoy-Gonzaga, Duchess of Mantua and Vicereine of Portugal". In Cruz, Anne J.; Stampino, Maria Galli (eds.). Early Modern Habsburg Women: Transnational Contexts, Cultural Conflicts, Dynastic Continuities. Routledge. pp. 59–78. ISBN 9781317146926.
