= Ferdinand III, Holy Roman Emperor =

Holy Roman Emperor from 1637 to 1657

Ferdinand III
- Imperator Romanorum
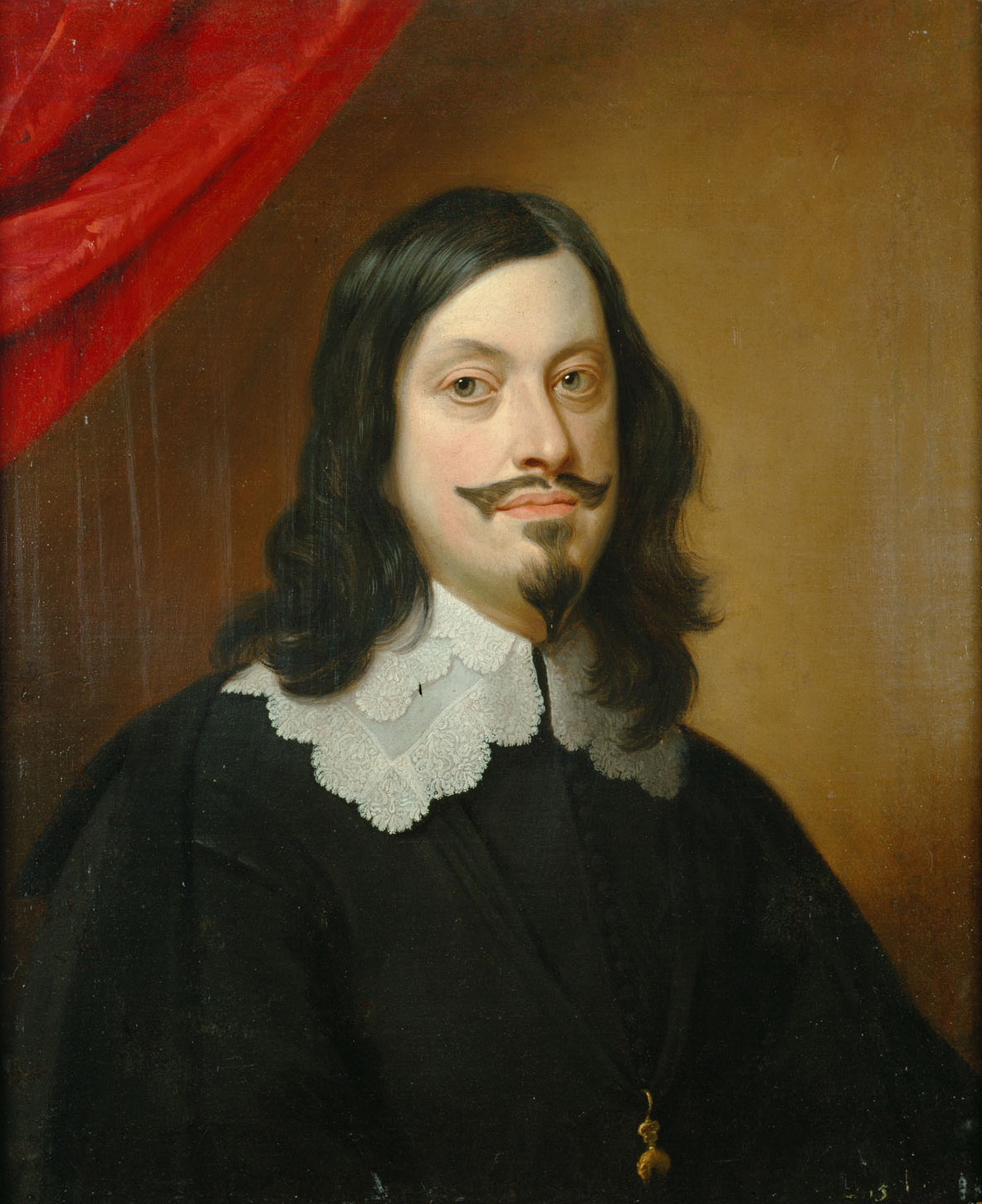
- Portrait by Jan van den Hoecke, 1643

Holy Roman Emperor
- Reign: 15 February 1637 – 2 April 1657
- Proclamation: 18 November 1637; Frankfurt Cathedral
- Predecessor: Ferdinand II
- Successor: Leopold I
- Born: 13 July 1608; Graz, Duchy of Styria, Holy Roman Empire
- Died: 2 April 1657 (aged 48); Vienna, Archduchy of Austria, Holy Roman Empire
- Burial: Imperial Crypt
- Spouses: Maria Anna of Spain (m. 1631; died 1646) Maria Leopoldine of Austria (m. 1648; died 1649) Eleonora Gonzaga (m. 1651)
- Issue: Ferdinand IV, King of the Romans; Mariana of Austria; Leopold I, Holy Roman Emperor; Archduke Charles Joseph of Austria; Eleonore of Austria, Queen of Poland; Maria Anna, Electoral Princess of the Palatinate
Names
- German: Ferdinand Ernst; English: Ferdinand Ernest
- House: Habsburg
- Father: Ferdinand II, Holy Roman Emperor
- Mother: Maria Anna of Bavaria
- Religion: Catholic Church

Ferdinand III (Ferdinand Ernest; 13 July 1608 – 2 April 1657) was Archduke of Austria, King of Hungary and Croatia from 1625, King of Bohemia from 1627 and Holy Roman Emperor from 1637 to his death.

Ferdinand ascended the throne at the beginning of the last decade of the Thirty Years' War and introduced lenient policies to depart from the old ideas of divine right held by his father, as he wished to end the war quickly. After military defeats and against a background of declining power, Ferdinand was compelled to abandon the political stances of his Habsburg predecessors in many respects to open the long road towards the much-delayed Peace of Westphalia. Although his authority as emperor was weakened after the war, his position in Bohemia, Hungary and Austria was stronger than that of his predecessors before 1618.

Ferdinand was the first Habsburg monarch to be recognised as a musical composer.

== Early life ==
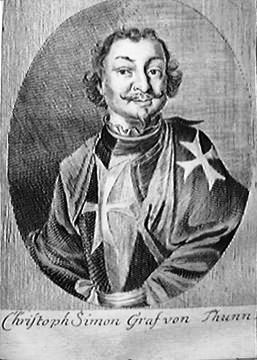
Christoph Simon von Thun (1582–1635), teacher of young Ferdinand III

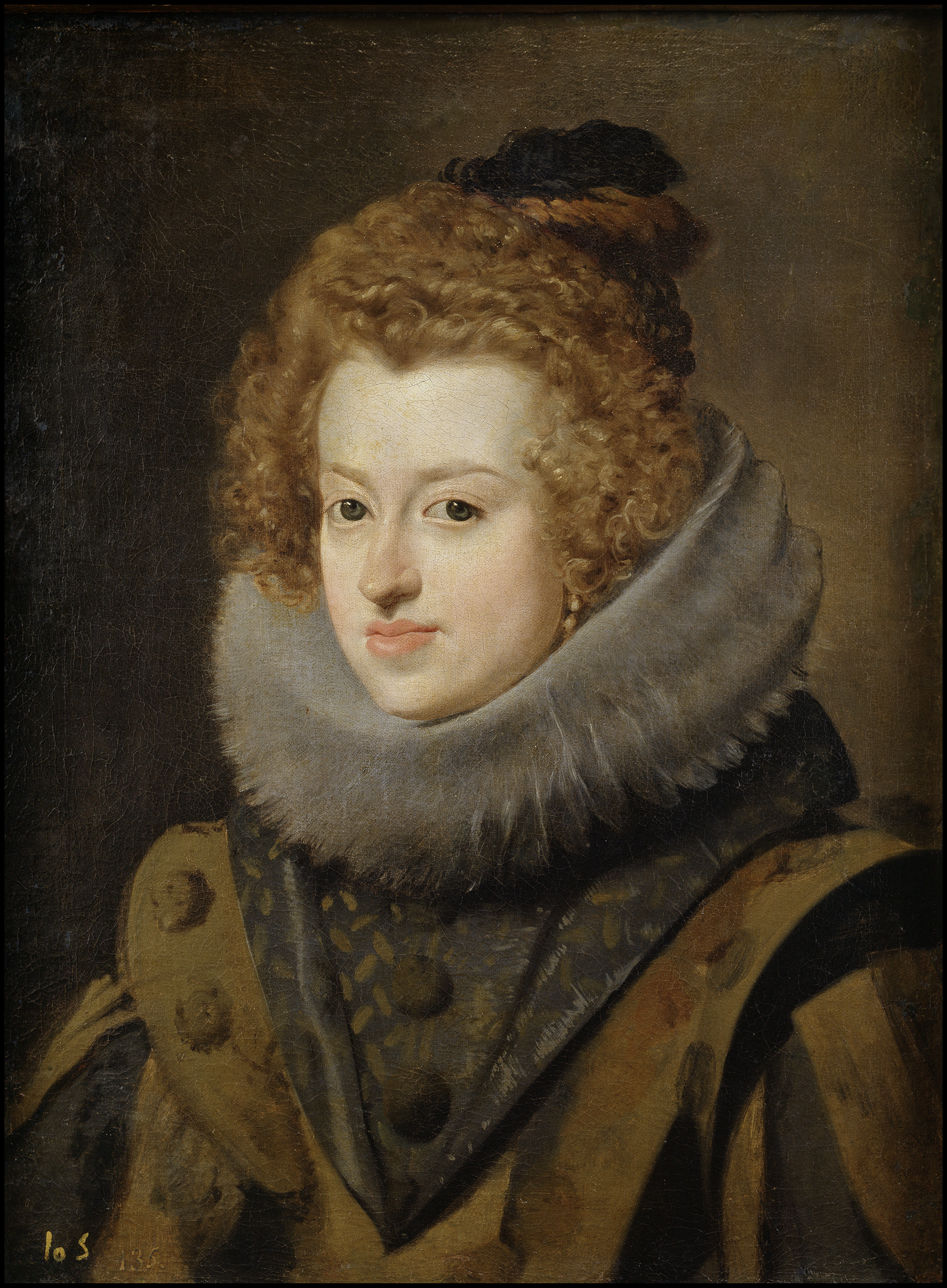
Portrait of Ferdinand's wife Maria Anna of Austria, by Diego Velázquez

Ferdinand was born in Graz as the third son of Ferdinand II, Holy Roman Emperor of Habsburg and his first wife, Maria Anna of Bavaria, and was baptised as Ferdinand Ernst. He grew up in Carinthia with loving care from his parents and developed great affection for his siblings and his father, with whom he always found a consensus in future disagreements. At his father's court, he received religious and scholarly training from Jesuits. The Teutonic knights Johann Jacob von Dhaun (member of the Lower Austrian estate, a union of the local nobility) and Christoph Simon von Thun (the head of Ferdinand's Imperial court and household) had greatly influenced the education of the young archduke. Simon von Thun instructed Ferdinand in military matters. Ferdinand is said to have spoken several languages, but how many and to what degree is unclear. After the deaths of his brothers Karl (1603) and Johann Karl (1619), he was designated as his father's successor and systematically prepared to take over the reign. Like his father, he was a devout Catholic, but he had a certain aversion to the influence of the Jesuits, who had ruled his father's court.

Ferdinand became Archduke of Austria in 1621. On 8 December 1625, he was crowned King of Hungary and on 27 November 1627, King of Bohemia. Ferdinand enhanced his authority and set an important legal and military precedent by issuing a Revised Land Ordinance, which deprived the Bohemian estates of their right to raise soldiers and reserved that power for the monarch. His father was unable to secure him the election as king of the Romans at the Diet of Regensburg of 1630. After he had unsuccessfully applied for the supreme command of the Imperial army and to participate in campaigns of Albrecht von Wallenstein, he joined Wallenstein's opponents at the Imperial court in Vienna and was involved in the arrangements for his second deposition in early 1634.

He married the Spanish Infanta, his cousin Maria Anna of Spain, after years of negotiations with Spanish relatives in 1631. Although it was in the middle of the war, the elaborate wedding was celebrated over fourteen months. The marriage produced six children, including his successors, Ferdinand IV of Hungary and Emperor Leopold I. His loving and intelligent wife and her brother, the Spanish Cardinal Infante Ferdinand, had a great influence on Ferdinand and formed the most important link between the Habsburg courts in Madrid, Brussels and Vienna in the difficult period of the war for the Habsburgs after the death of Wallenstein.

== Commander in chief ==
After Wallenstein's assassination, Ferdinand III personally took command of the Imperial army on 2 May 1634 and was supported by the generals Matthias Gallas and Ottavio Piccolomini, the military adviser Johann Kaspar von Stadion and the political adviser Obersthofmeister (Lord Chamberlain) Maximilian von und zu Trauttmansdorff. He achieved his first major military successes in July 1634 by regaining the city of Regensburg, which had been captured and occupied by the Swedish Empire in November 1633. In August 1634, the city of Donauwörth was recaptured, which had been occupied by Sweden since April 1632. In September 1634, those successes were surpassed by the decisive victory of the Battle of Nördlingen, a joint effort with the help of the Spanish forces under Cardinal Infante Ferdinand.

As a consequence, the Swedes lost control over southern Germany and retreated to northern Germany. Ferdinand gained a wider political influence even if his personal contribution in Nördlingen had been rather limited. His influence increased further after the fall of the powerful Imperial minister, Hans Ulrich von Eggenberg, who had dominated the politics of Ferdinand II.

In 1635, Ferdinand III worked as Imperial commissioner in the negotiations for the Peace of Prague, as he tried to persuade the prince electors to adopt the idea of concerted warfare. He also advocated the inclusion of the still-reluctant Protestant estates into the peace process. Even after the resignation of the supreme command, Ferdinand continued to occupy himself with theoretical military issues. Raimondo Montecuccoli later dedicated one of his works to him.

== Sovereign rule ==
=== Wartime reign ===
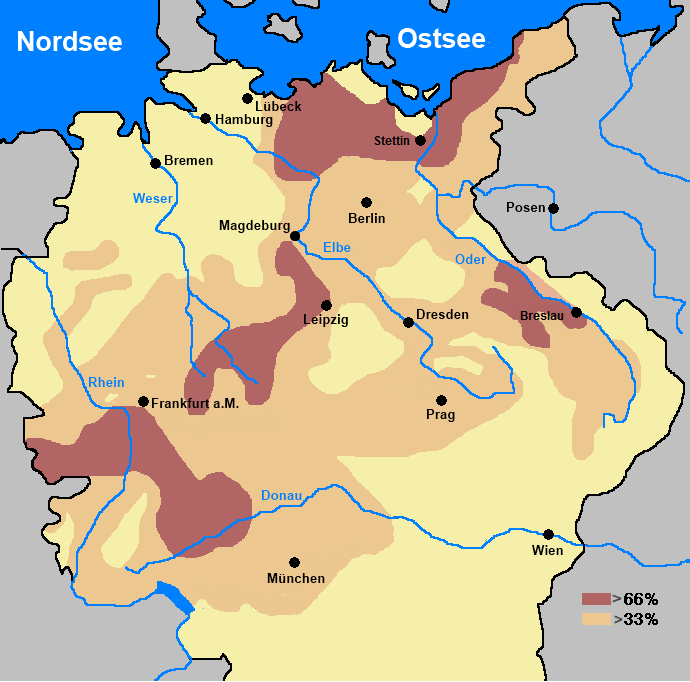
Population decline in the empire as a consequence of the Thirty Years' War

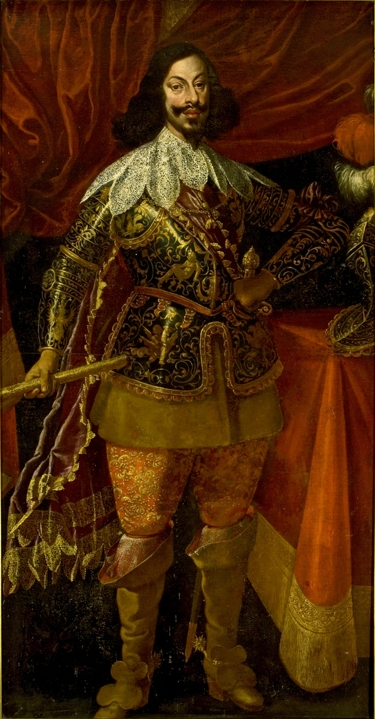
Portrait of Ferdinand III

Ferdinand III was elected as King of the Romans at the Diet of Regensburg on 22 December 1636. Upon the death of his father on 15 February 1637, Ferdinand became emperor. His political adviser Trauttmansdorff advanced to the position of Prime Minister of Austria and chief diplomat, but was replaced by John Louis of Nassau-Hadamar in 1647 because of health, which had begun to deteriorate. Trauttmansdorff was succeeded as Obersthofmeister by the later Prime Minister Johann Weikhard of Auersperg, who also taught the royal heir, Ferdinand IV. Unlike his father, Ferdinand III employed no spiritual counsellor.

When Ferdinand became emperor, vast sections of the imperial territories had been absolutely devastated by two decades of war. The population was completely exhausted and massively diminished; countless people were impoverished, disabled, sick or homeless; and many had lost their families and had abandoned all moral standards. Ferdinand did not endeavour to continue the war, but the momentum of the war, the political circumstances and his reluctance to act prevented a quick end to the war. Any hope to make early peace with France and Sweden did not materialise.

With the intervention of France in 1635, the war flared up again. After initial success and a combined Spanish-Imperial campaign into the heart of France in 1636, the military situation of the emperor sharply deteriorated. The Swedes regained initiative with victory at the Battle of Wittstock in 1636 and threatened his recently gained allies: Brandenburg-Prussia and Saxony. Ferdinand reacted by redirecting his main army under Gallas from France to northern Germany in 1637. Gallas could contain the Swedes in Pomerania until a severe lack of supplies forced him to retreat back to Bohemia in late 1638. At the same time, Bernhard of Saxe-Weimar, a German Protestant in French service, took the Habsburg possessions in Alsace and the stronghold of Breisach after a long siege. To check the advance of Swedish General Johan Banér, who invaded Bohemia via Saxony in 1639, Ferdinand had to recall Piccolomini's army from the Spanish Netherlands, which largely ended direct military co-operation with Spain. Although Piccolomini and the emperor's brother Archduke Leopold Wilhelm, as the new Imperial commander, could repel Banér back to the Weser river in 1640, the Bohemian lands now underwent continuous threat, and the emperor permanently lost control over northern Germany.

An Imperial Diet was arranged for 1641 in Regensburg, where the estates discussed possible peace arrangements. It turned out to be problematic that the Emperor had excluded princes, who had previously been on the opposing side, as well as the Protestant administrators of various princes of the Imperial Diet. However, it finally succeeded in making all imperial estates agree, with the exception of the Electoral Palatinate, the Duchy of Brunswick-Lüneburg and Hesse-Kassel to the resolutions of the Diet. In 1641, a preliminary peace was signed in Hamburg between Ferdinand, Spain, France and Sweden, and a final peace congress was to convene in Osnabrück and Münster. An alliance between Sweden and France was fully effective since 1642. The Swedes won the Battle of Breitenfeld in 1642. One year later, France decisively defeated Spain at the Battle of Rocroi and could now dedicate more troops to the German theatre.

=== Peace negotiations ===
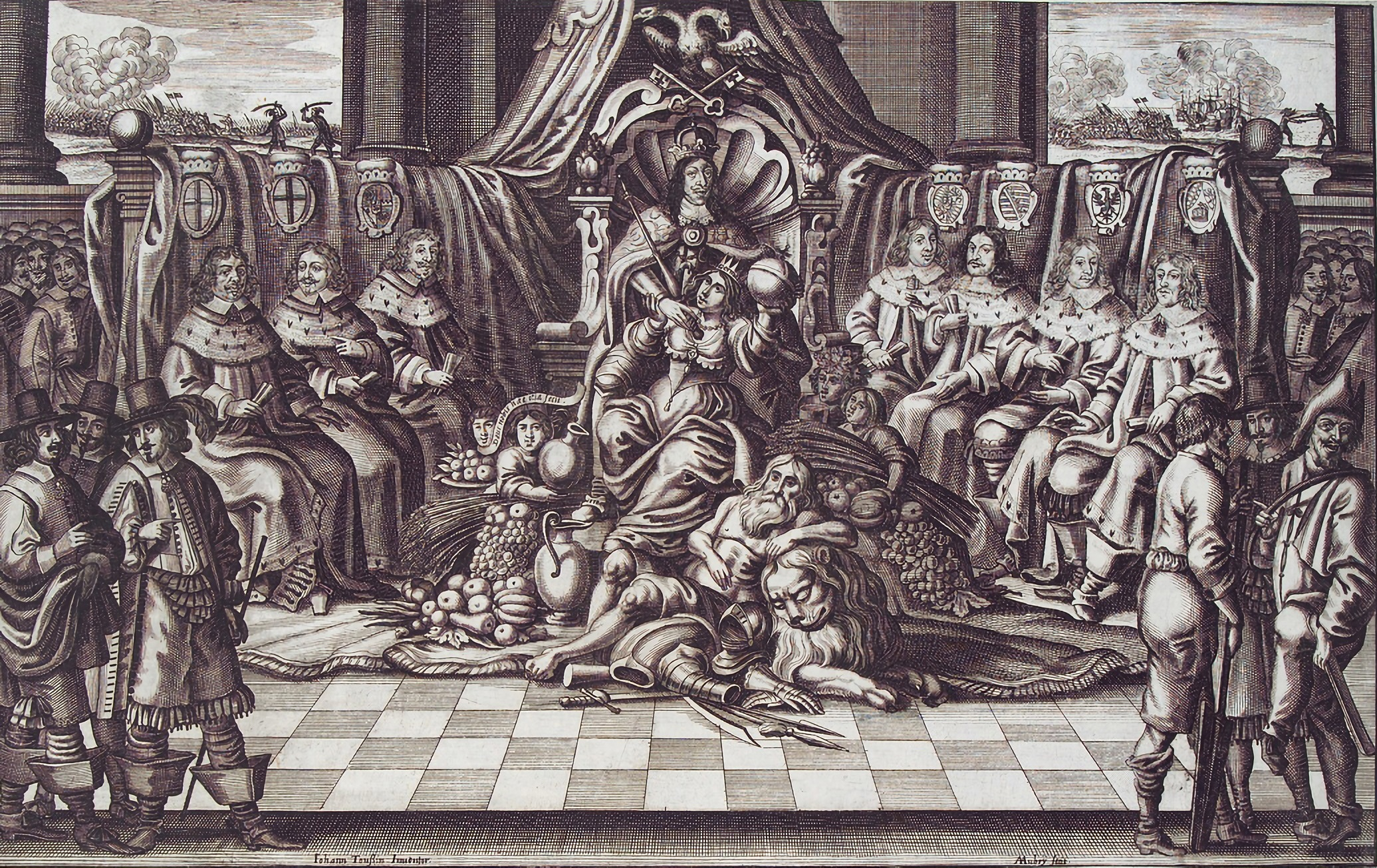
Emperor Ferdinand III with the electoral princes, Copperplate engraving by Abraham Aubry, Nuremberg 1663/1664

Negotiations for a peace agreement began in 1644 in Münster and Osnabrück and lasted until 1648, while the war continued. The negotiations in Westphalia turned out to be difficult and began with a dispute over the rules of procedure. The emperor had to give in to pressure from France and Sweden and to admit all imperial estates to the congress and receive the ius belli ac pacis. In addition to peace between the parties involved, the internal constitution of the empire was also newly regulated. The Imperial Court received weekly reports on the negotiations. Even though the reports had been produced by officials, the process also proved to be an extremely busy time for the emperor since, despite all of his advisers, he had to make the decisions. The study of the documents suggests that Ferdinand was a monarch with expertise and a sense of responsibility and the willingness to make difficult decisions. In the course of the negotiations, Ferdinand had to reconsider his original goals according to the deteriorating military situation. His advisor Trauttmansdorff suggested a great battle to end the war favourably.

The emperor personally took part in the campaign against the Swedes, which ended with a defeat at the Battle of Jankau on 6 March 1645. The Swedish army under Lennart Torstensson then advanced to Vienna. To raise morale in the city, the emperor circled the city in a large procession with an image of the Virgin Mary. As the Swedish army drew closer, Ferdinand left the city. Archduke Leopold Wilhelm managed to drive off the opponents. At times, Ferdinand managed to get Prince George I Rákóczi of Transylvania, an ally of France and Sweden, on his side. In the 1645 Peace of Linz, the emperor had to guarantee the Hungarian estates the right of imperial representation and freedom of religion for the Protestants, which prevented the Counter-Reformation and future absolutist rule in Hungary.

The Habsburgs could no longer win the war without the support of their Spanish allies. Domestic difficulties stopped Spanish financial and military support for Ferdinand in 1645. Without foreign military funds, the Imperial troops were incapable of offensive operations, which weakened Ferdinand's position in negotiations. He reissued the instructions for the peace talks for Trautmannsdorf, who left for Westphalia as chief negotiator. The documents were kept strictly secret and were published only in 1962. Reviews revealed that Ferdinand had surrendered numerous previous claims and was ready for greater concessions than were ultimately necessary.

=== Results of war ===
The empire suffered considerable territorial losses. The Three Bishoprics, effectively under French control since 1552, were officially ceded to France. The Netherlands and Switzerland gained complete independence. Within the empire, Sweden received Rügen and Western Pomerania, as well as the bishoprics of Bremen-Verden and the city of Wismar, as Imperial fiefs. The Tyrolean cadet line of the Habsburgs lost the Sundgau and Breisach in the Upper Rhine to France, as well as supremacy over the Décapole. Further transfers of property took place in various regions of the empire. Bavaria retained the electoral dignity that it had won at the beginning of the war, a further (eighth) electoral estate being created in the Palatinate.

The implementation of the Counter-Reformation in the core countries of Ferdinand was sanctioned. Only in some parts of Silesia were certain concessions made to the Protestants. From now on, the institutions of the empire would be equally occupied by Catholics and Protestants. The imperial estates could enforce considerable rights. That included the right to form alliances with foreign powers, even if they were not allowed to be directed against the emperor or the empire. The largest territories benefited most from those regulations. Ferdinand's attempt at absolutist rule of the empire failed, but the empire and the imperial office remained significant.

The emperor considered the peace agreement to be no catastrophic defeat, and thanks to Trautmannsdorff's negotiating skills, worse was prevented. As a matter of fact, the consequences for the Austrian hereditary lands were comparatively favourable. The expropriations in Bohemia and the Verneuerte Landesordnung (Renewed Regional Order) of 1627 remained untouched. Upper Austria, which had been pledged to Bavaria, stayed under Habsburg house rule without paying a refund.

Despite many losses, the constitutional position of the emperor after the Peace of Westphalia permitted an active imperial policy in co-operation with parts of the estates. In the Habsburg monarchy, the prerequisites for the development of a uniform absolutist state remained intact. Thus, imperial policies of the peace negotiations succeeded in that respect despite the failure to meet some of the original negotiation goals.

=== Postwar ===
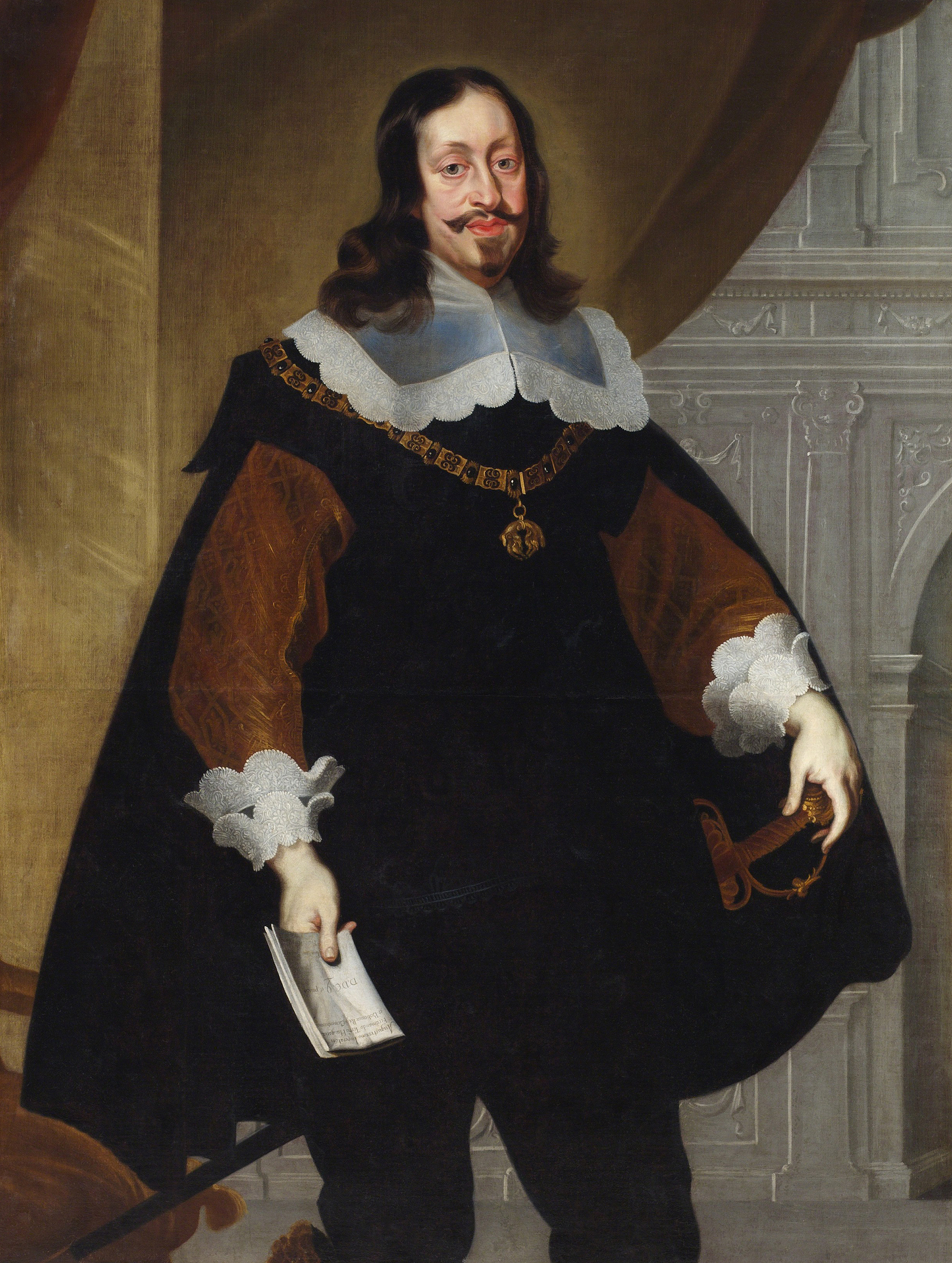
Portrait by Frans Luycx, c. 1660–1668

At the Nuremberg peace congress of 1649/1650, the final withdrawal of foreign troops and the political settlement of the relationship with Sweden and France were carried out, during which hostilities nearly started again.

Empress Maria Anna of Spain had died giving birth to her last child on 13 May 1646. Ferdinand remarried to another first cousin, Maria Leopoldine of Austria (1632–1649), on 2 July 1648. The wedding ceremony, held in Linz, was notably splendid. The marriage, however, lasted little more than a year and ended with Maria Leopoldine's own premature death in childbirth.

Ferdinand's last marriage was to Eleonora Gonzaga in 1651. Empress Eleonora was very pious and donated, among other things, to the Ursuline monastery in Vienna and the Order of the Starry Cross for noble women. She was also well educated and interested in art. She also composed music and wrote poetry and, together with Ferdinand, was the centre of the Italian Academy.

Ferdinand's sovereign power in the Austrian hereditary lands, as well as his royal power in Hungary and Bohemia, was significantly greater than his predecessor's had been before 1618. Princely power was strengthened, and the influence of the estates was massively reduced. The church reform towards the Counter-Reformation continued. Ferdinand formed a standing army from the remains of the Imperial army that was soon to show great effectiveness under his successor, Leopold I, Holy Roman Emperor, the fortifications of Vienna were massively expanded and updated, as he invested a total sum of over 80,000 fl.

Despite a considerable loss of authority in the empire, Ferdinand remained active in imperial politics. He would also re-establish his positions in the empire's institutions. Ferdinand had the Aulic Council restructured, which competed with the Imperial Chamber Court. It had already been recognised at the Peace of Westphalia and remained in effect until 1806. In late 1652, he summoned a Reichstag in Regensburg, which lasted until 1654. The event was the last traditional imperial diet and was replaced by the future Perpetual Reichstag, with its permanent congress of emissaries. The Reichstag decided that the content of the peace treaties in Münster and Osnabrück under imperial law should become part of the imperial constitution.

The emperor managed to postpone some of the constitutional questions that were particularly dangerous for his power. The fact that some of the nobles who had been raised by his father to the rank of prince gained a seat and a vote in the Reichstag also speaks for his growing strength. At this Reichstag, he also made an alliance with Poland-Lithuania against Sweden. His empire came to Poland's support during the Second Northern War. Ferdinand also brought about the royal election of his son Ferdinand IV, who, however, died in 1654. Because his second son, Leopold, was still too young to be elected as King of the Romans, Ferdinand delayed the opening and the conclusion of the Deputationstag after the Reichstag to gain time until the next election. Finally, Leopold was crowned King of Hungary and Bohemia. In 1656, Ferdinand sent an army into Italy to assist Spain in its struggle with France.

== Death and burial place ==
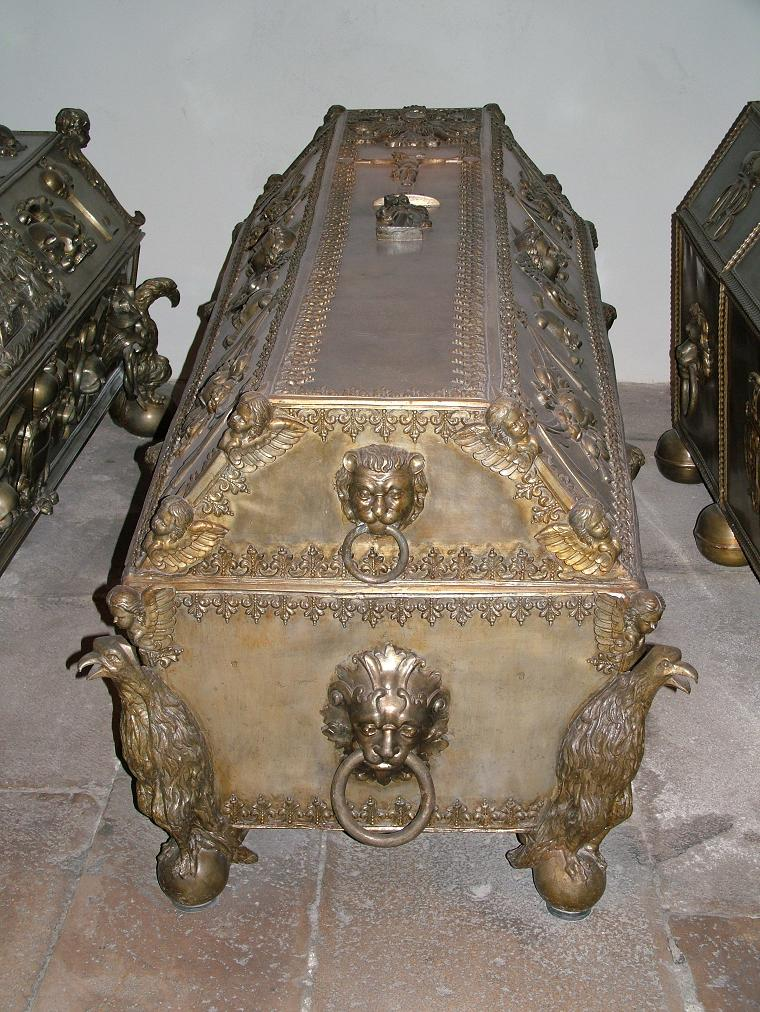
Emperor Ferdinand III's sarcophagus in the Vienna Capuchin Crypt

Ferdinand died on 2 April 1657 and rests in the Capuchin Crypt in Vienna. His interior organs were separately buried in the Ducal Crypt.

== Marriages and children ==
On 20 February 1631, Ferdinand III married his first wife, Maria Anna of Spain (1606–1646). She was the youngest daughter of Philip III of Spain and Margaret of Austria. They were first cousins, as Maria Anna's mother was a sister of Ferdinand's father. They were parents to six children:

- Ferdinand IV, King of the Romans (8 September 1633 – 9 July 1654)
- Archduchess Maria Anna "Mariana" of Austria (22 December 1634 – 16 May 1696). At the age of 14, she was married to her maternal uncle Philip IV of Spain. Their daughter Margaret Theresa of Spain married Mariana's brother Leopold I, Holy Roman Emperor.
- Archduke Philip August of Austria (15 July 1637 – 22 June 1639)
- Archduke Maximilian Thomas of Austria (21 December 1638 – 29 June 1639)
- Leopold I, Holy Roman Emperor (9 June 1640 – 5 May 1705)
- Archduchess Maria of Austria (13 May 1646)

On 2 July 1648 in Linz, Ferdinand III married his second wife, Archduchess Maria Leopoldine of Austria (1632–1649). She was a daughter of Leopold V, Archduke of Austria and Claudia de' Medici. They were first cousins as male-line grandchildren of Charles II, Archduke of Austria, and Maria Anna of Bavaria. They had a single son:

- Archduke Charles Joseph of Austria (7 August 1649 – 27 January 1664). He was Grand Master of the Teutonic Knights from 1662 to his death.

On 30 April 1651, Ferdinand III married Eleonora Gonzaga. She was a daughter of Charles II Gonzaga, Duke of Nevers. They were parents to four children:

- Archduchess Theresia Maria Josefa of Austria (27 March 1652 – 26 July 1653);
- Eleonore of Austria, Queen of Poland (21 May 1653 – 17 December 1697); married first Michał Korybut Wiśniowiecki, King of Poland, and then Charles V, Duke of Lorraine;
- Archduchess Maria Anna Josepha of Austria (30 December 1654 – 4 April 1689); married Johann Wilhelm, Elector Palatine;
- Archduke Ferdinand Josef Alois of Austria (11 February 1657 – 16 June 1658)

== Music ==
Ferdinand III was a well-known patron of music and a composer. He studied music under Giovanni Valentini, who bequeathed his musical works to him, and had close ties with Johann Jakob Froberger, one of the most important keyboard composers of the 17th century. Froberger lamented the emperor's death and dedicated to him one of his most celebrated works, Lamentation faite sur la mort très douloureuse de Sa Majesté Impériale, Ferdinand le troisième; a tombeau for Ferdinand III's death was composed by the violinist Johann Heinrich Schmelzer. Some of Ferdinand's own compositions survive in manuscripts: masses, motets, hymns and other sacred music, as well as a few secular pieces. His Drama musicum was praised by Athanasius Kircher, and the extant works, although clearly influenced by Valentini, show a composer with an individual style and a solid technique.

Recordings of Ferdinand's compositions include:

Jesu Redemptor Omnium. Deus Tuorum. Humanae Salutis. With Schmelzer: Lamento Sopra La Morte de Ferdinand III Joseph I: Regina Coeli. Leopold I: Sonata Piena; Laudate Pueri. Wiener Akademie, dir. Martin Haselböck, CPO 1997;
Ferdinand III: Hymnus "Jesu Corona Virginum". On Musik für Gamben-Consort. Klaus Mertens, Hamburger Ratsmusik, dir. Simone Eckert CPO 2010.

== Ancestry ==
Ancestors of Ferdinand III, Holy Roman Emperor

8. Ferdinand I, Holy Roman Emperor
4. Charles II, Archduke of Austria
9. Anna of Bohemia and Hungary
2. Ferdinand II, Holy Roman Emperor
10. Albert V, Duke of Bavaria (= 12)
5. Maria Anna of Bavaria (born 1551)
11. Archduchess Anna of Austria (= 13)
1. Ferdinand III, Holy Roman Emperor
12. Albert V, Duke of Bavaria (= 10)
6. William V, Duke of Bavaria
13. Anna of Austria (= 11)
3. Maria Anna of Bavaria (born 1574)
14. Francis I, Duke of Lorraine
7. Renata of Lorraine
15. Christina of Denmark

== Male-line family tree ==
House of Habsburg

Original line
Albert; Count of Habsburg c. 1188–1239
Rudolf I of Germany c. 1218–1291
Albert I of Germany; 1255–1308	Hartmann; 1263–1281	Rudolf II; Duke of Austria; 1270–1290
Rudolf I of Bohemia; 1281–1307	Frederick the Fair c. 1289–1330	Leopold I Duke of Austria; 1290–1326	Albert II; Duke of Austria; 1298–1358	Henry the Friendly; 1299–1327	Otto; Duke of Austria; 1301–1339	John; Parricida c. 1290–1312/1313
Albertinian line	Leopoldian line
Rudolf IV; Duke of Austria; 1339–1365	Frederick III; 1347–1362	Albert III; Duke of Austria; 1349–1395	Leopold III; Duke of Austria; 1351–1386	Frederick II; Duke of Austria; 1327–1344	Leopold II; Duke of Austria; 1328–1344
Albert IV; Duke of Austria; 1377–1404	William; Duke of Austria c. 1370–1406	Leopold IV; Duke of Austria; 1371–1411	Ernest; Duke of Austria; 1377–1424	Frederick IV; Duke of Austria; 1382–1439
Albert II of Germany; 1397–1439	Frederick III; HRE; 1415–1493	Albert VI; Archduke of Austria; 1418–1463	Sigismund; Archduke of Austria; 1427–1496
Ladislaus the Posthumous; 1440–1457	Maximilian I HRE; 1459–1519
Philip I of Castile; 1478–1506
Spanish / Iberian line	Austrian / HRE line
Charles V HRE; 1500–1558	Ferdinand I HRE; 1503–1564
Philip II of Spain; 1527–1598	Maximilian II; HRE; 1527–1576	Ferdinand II; Archduke of Austria; 1529–1595	Charles II; Archduke of Austria; 1540–1590
Carlos; Prince of Asturias; 1545–1568	Philip III of Spain; 1578–1621	Rudolf II; HRE; 1552–1612	Ernest of Austria; 1553–1595	Matthias; HRE; 1557–1619	Maximilian III; Archduke of Austria; 1558–1618	Albert VII; Archduke of Austria; 1559–1621	Wenceslaus; Archduke of Austria; 1561–1578	Andrew; Margrave of Burgau; 1558–1600	Charles; Margrave of Burgau; 1560–1618	Ferdinand II; HRE; 1578–1637	Maximilian Ernest of Austria; 1583–1616	Leopold V Archduke of Austria; 1586–1632	Charles of Austria; 1590–1624
Philip IV of Spain; 1605–1665	Charles of Austria; 1607–1632	Ferdinand of Austria; 1609–1641	John-Charles of Austria; 1605–1619	Ferdinand III; HRE; 1608–1657	Leopold Wilhelm of Austria; 1614–1662	Ferdinand Charles; Archduke of Austria; 1628–1662	Sigismund Francis; Archduke of Austria; 1630–1665
Balthasar Charles; Prince of Asturias; 1629–1646	Charles II of Spain; 1661–1700	Ferdinand IV; King of the Romans; 1633–1654	Leopold I HRE; 1640–1705	Charles Joseph of Austria; 1649–1664
Joseph I HRE; 1678–1711	Charles VI; HRE; 1685–1740
Lorraine
Maria Theresa; HRE; 1740–1780	Francis I HRE; 1745–1765
Habsburg-Lorraine
Joseph II; HRE; 1765–1790	Leopold II; HRE; 1790–1792
Francis II; HRE; 1792–1806

== See also ==
- Kings of Germany family tree. He was related to every other king of Germany.

== Bibliography ==
- Hengerer, Mark (2012). Kaiser Ferdinand III (1608–1657): Eine Biographie (in German). Wien – Köln – Weimar: Böhlau Verlag. ISBN 978-3-205-77765-6.
- Höbelt, Lothar (2008). Ferdinand III (1608–1657). Friedenskaiser wider Willen (in German). Graz: Ares Verlag. ISBN 978-3-90247-556-5.

Ferdinand III, Holy Roman Emperor House of Habsburg Born: 13 July 1608 Died: 2 April 1657
Regnal titles
Preceded by Ferdinand II, Holy Roman Emperor	King of Hungary and Croatia; 1625 – 1657 with Ferdinand II, Holy Roman Emperor (1625 – 1637); Ferdinand IV of Hungary (1647 – 1654)	Succeeded by Leopold I, Holy Roman Emperor
Preceded by Ferdinand II, Holy Roman Emperor	King of Bohemia; 1627 – 1657 with Ferdinand II, Holy Roman Emperor (1627 – 1637); Ferdinand IV of Hungary (1646 – 1654)	Succeeded by Leopold I, Holy Roman Emperor
Preceded by Ferdinand II, Holy Roman Emperor	Holy Roman Emperor; Archduke of Lower and Inner Austria; 1637 – 1657	Succeeded by Leopold I, Holy Roman Emperor
Preceded by Ferdinand II, Holy Roman Emperor	King in Germany; 1636 – 1657 with Ferdinand II, Holy Roman Emperor (1636 – 1637); Ferdinand IV of Hungary (1653 – 1654)	Succeeded by Leopold I, Holy Roman Emperor
Preceded by Elizabeth Lucretia, Duchess of Cieszyn	Duke of Teschen; 1653 – 1657 with Ferdinand IV of Hungary (1653 – 1654)	Succeeded by Leopold I, Holy Roman Emperor
