= Maria Gonzaga, Duchess of Montferrat =

Maria Gonzaga
- Regent of Mantua
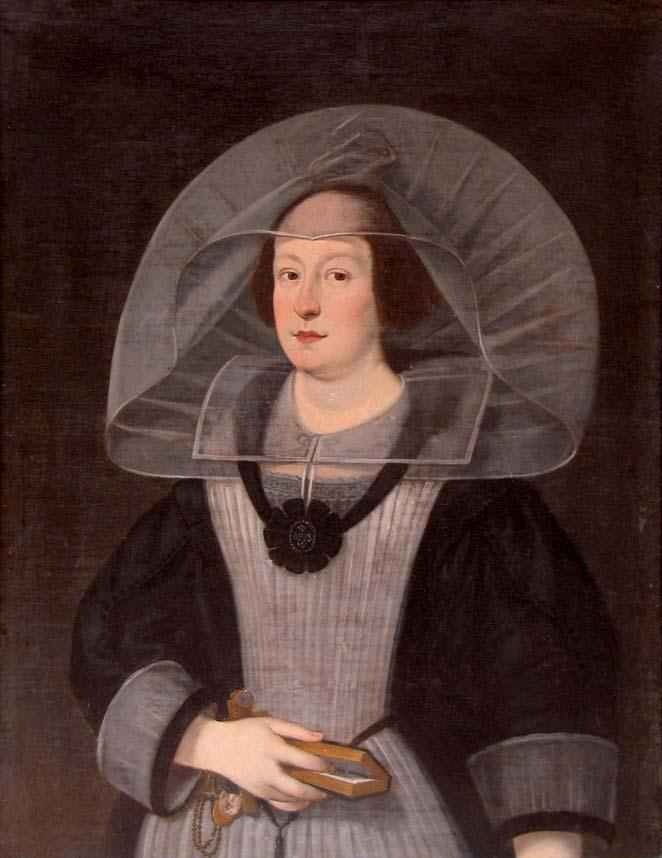
- Born: 29 July 1609; Mantua
- Died: 14 August 1660 (aged 51); Mantua
- Spouse: Charles Gonzaga, Duke of Nevers (m. 1627; died 1631)
- Issue: Maria Gonzaga; Charles II, Duke of Mantua and Montferrat; Eleonora, Holy Roman Empress
Names
- Maria Gonzaga
- House: Gonzaga
- Father: Francesco Gonzaga
- Mother: Margaret of Savoy

Maria Gonzaga or Maria of Mantua (29 July 1609 – 14 August 1660) was a reigning duchess of Montferrat from 1612 until 1660, and regent in Mantua during the minority of her son from 1637 until 1647.

== Biography ==
Maria was the eldest and only surviving child of Francesco IV Gonzaga, Duke of Mantua and Montferrat and Margaret of Savoy (1589–1655), daughter of Charles Emmanuel I, Duke of Savoy and Infanta Catalina Micaela of Spain.

Maria's father died aged 26 in 1612 when she was only three years old, and was succeeded as Duke of Mantua by his two brothers, who had no issue. This made Maria and her husband Charles of Nevers in 1627 successors to the two Duchies. Maria was already Duchess of Montferrat since 1612. This led to the War of Mantuan Succession.

The outcome was that, after the death of her husband Charles in 1631, his father Charles became the new Duke of Mantua until his death in 1637.

Maria exercised the regency of Mantua on behalf of her son for ten years, until 1647. She died in 1660, aged 51.

== Issue ==
Maria and Charles had:

- Maria Gonzaga
- Charles Gonzaga (1629–1665) married Archduchess Isabella Clara of Austria
- Eleanor Gonzaga (1630–1686), who married in 1651 Ferdinand III, Holy Roman Emperor

== See also ==
- House of Gonzaga
- Rulers of Mantua
- Rulers of Montferrat

== Sources ==
- Parrott, David (1997). "The Mantuan Succession, 1627–31: A Sovereignty Dispute in Early Modern Europe". The English Historical Review. CXII, Issue 445, February (445). Oxford Academic: 20–65. doi:10.1093/ehr/CXII.445.20.
