= Charles II Gonzaga of Mantua and Montferrat =

Duke of Mantua and Montferrat from 1637 to 1665

Charles II Gonzaga
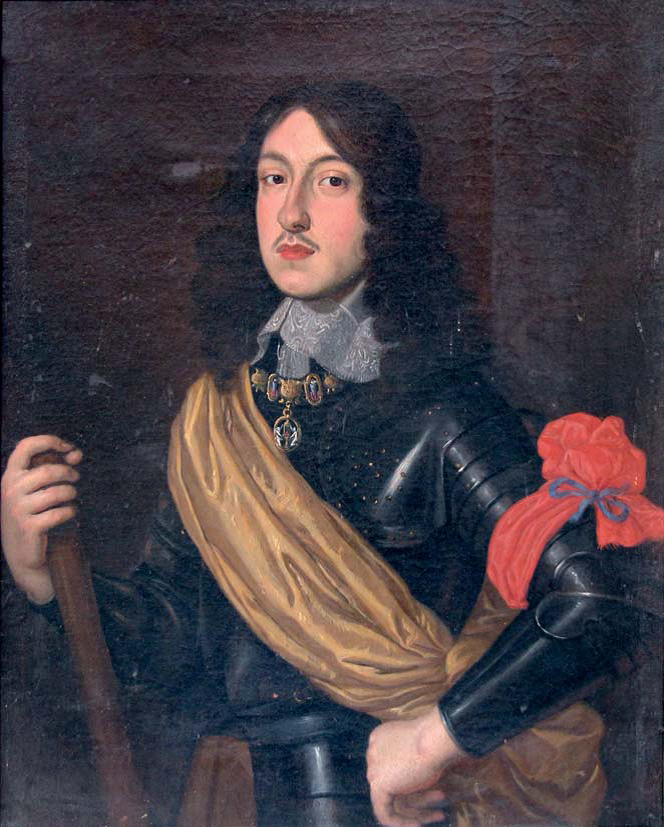
- Portrait of Duke Charles II

Duke of Mantua and Montferrat
- Reign: 22 September 1637 - 14 August 1665
- Predecessor: Charles I Gonzaga
- Successor: Ferdinand Charles Gonzaga
- Born: 3 October 1629; Mantua, Duchy of Mantua
- Died: 14 August 1665 (aged 35); Mantua, Duchy of Mantua
- Burial: Santuario di Santa Maria delle Grazie, Curtatone
- Spouse: Archduchess Isabella Clara of Austria (m. 1649; died 1665)
- Issue: Ferdinand Charles, Duke of Mantua and Montferrat
- House: Gonzaga
- Father: Charles of Gonzaga-Nevers
- Mother: Maria Gonzaga

Charles II Gonzaga (31 October 1629 – 14 August 1665) was the son of Charles of Gonzaga-Nevers (d. 1631) of Rethel, Nevers, Mantua, and Montferrat; and Maria Gonzaga. He followed his grandfather Charles I, Duke of Mantua, in 1637 as ruler of these lands, the first ten years under regency of his mother Duchess Maria. On 22 March 1657, Charles II received the appointment as Imperial Vicar in Italy. Charles sold the Duchies of Nevers and Rethel in 1659 to Cardinal Jules Mazarin, the de facto Regent of France, and they became part of France.

On 7 November 1649, Charles II married Isabella Clara of Austria (12 August 1629 – 24 February 1685), a daughter of Leopold V, Archduke of Austria, and thus into the imperial family. The marriage was an act of diplomacy and they had only one child, his successor Ferdinand Charles, Duke of Mantua and Montferrat (1652–1708). The relationship between husband and wife effectively ended, and Charles continued a relationship with a noblewoman Margherita della Rovere, and also had affairs with men including the castrato Atto Melani. In his book, The Last Medici, Harold Acton records that his death occurred in the midst of lascivious intercourse.

Charles tried to revive the tradition of his family as patrons of the arts and to rebuild his family's art collection, which had been largely sold off by his forebears. In 1657, he appointed the Flemish painter and printmaker Daniel van den Dyck as his official court painter, architect, surveyor of his building program and engineer for stage designs for the theatre. After van den Dyck's death, he appointed on 4 April 1663 another Flemish painter called Frans Geffels as his new court painter.

== Ancestry ==
Ancestors of Charles II Gonzaga of Mantua and Montferrat

16. Federico II Gonzaga, Duke of Mantua
8. Louis Gonzaga, Duke of Nevers
17. Margaret Palaeologina
4. Charles I of Nevers
18. Francis I of Cleves, Duke of Nevers
9. Henriette of Cleves
19. Marguerite of Bourbon-La Marche
2. Charles II of Nevers
20. Francis, Duke of Guise
10. Charles, Duke of Mayenne
21. Anna d'Este
5. Catherine of Mayenne
22. Honorato II de Savoy
11. Henriette of Savoy, Marquise de Villars
23. Jeanne Françoise of Foix
1. Charles II Gonzaga
24. Guglielmo Gonzaga, Duke of Mantua
12. Vincenzo I Gonzaga
25. Archduchess Eleanor of Austria
6. Francesco IV Gonzaga
26. Francesco I de' Medici, Grand Duke of Tuscany
13. Eleonora de' Medici
27. Archduchess Joanna of Austria
3. Maria Gonzaga
28. Emmanuel Philibert, Duke of Savoy
14. Charles Emmanuel I, Duke of Savoy
29. Margaret of France, Duchess of Berry
7. Margaret of Savoy
30. Philip II of Spain
15. Catherine Michelle of Spain
31. Elisabeth of Valois

== Honours ==
- Grand Master of the Order of the Redeemer

== Sources ==
- Condren, John (2021). "The role of women in Louis XIV's relationship with the Gonzaga-Nevers di Mantova between 1665 and 1691". In Anderson, Roberta; Santaliestra, Laura Oliván; Suner, Suna (eds.). Gender and Diplomacy: Women and Men in European Embassies from the 15th to the 18th century. Hollitzer Verlag.

Regnal titles
Preceded by Charles I	Duke of Mantua and Montferrat; 1637–1665	Succeeded by Ferdinand Charles
