= House of Acquaviva =

Noble family

Acquaviva
- Left: House Acquaviva; Right: House Acquaviva d'Aragona
- Country: Kingdom of Sicily; Kingdom of Naples; Kingdom of the Two Sicilies; Kingdom of Italy; Italy
- Founded: 12th century
- Founder: Rinaldo di Acquaviva
- Titles: Prince of Caserta; Duke of Atri, Nardò and Noci; Marquis of Bitonto and Bellante; Count of Caserta; Count of Conversano, Castellana, Gioia and San Flaviano and others
- Cadet branches: Acquaviva di Caserta e Bellante; Acquaviva di Conversano; Acquaviva di Nardò

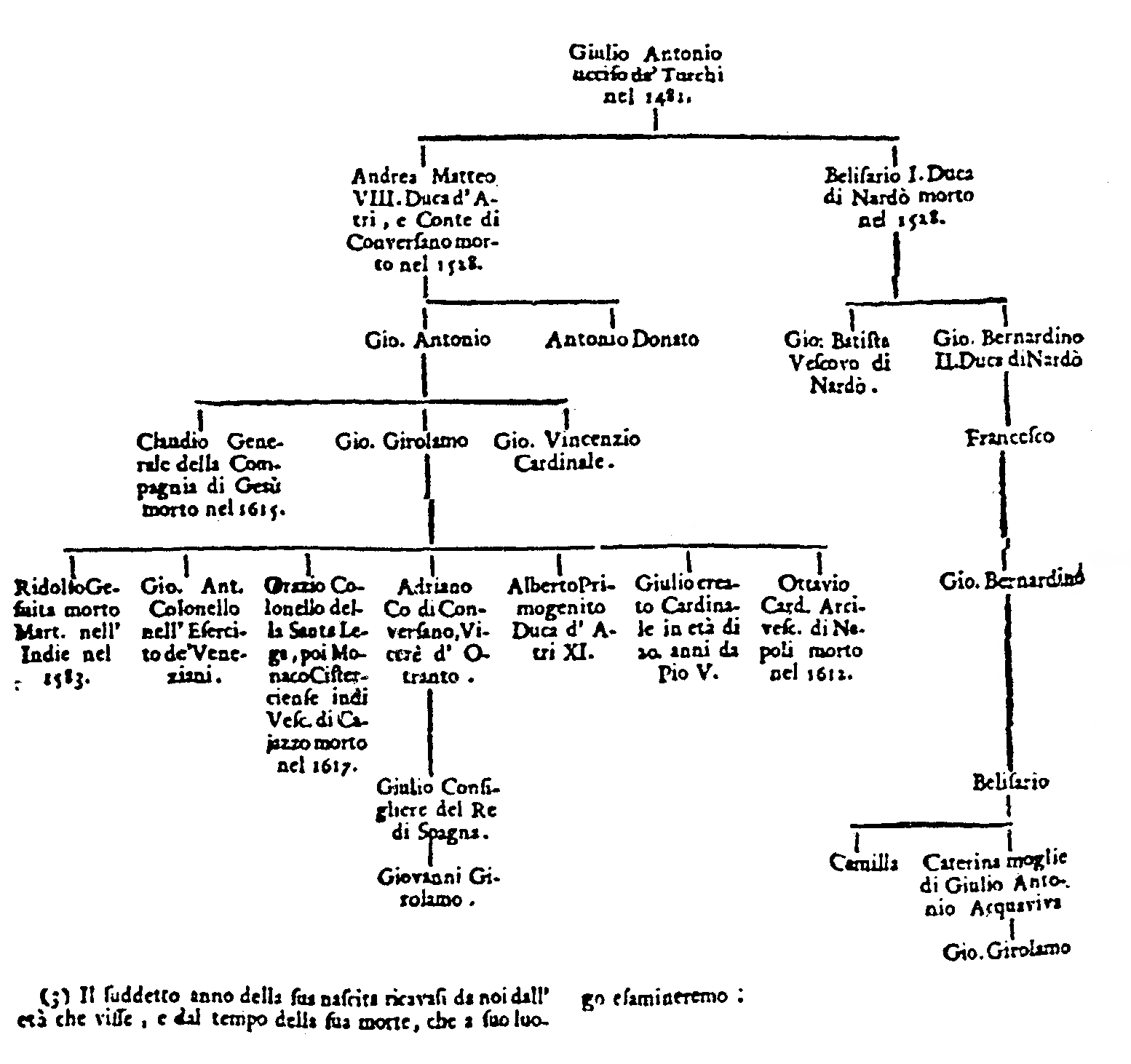
Acquaviva family tree.

The House of Acquaviva is an aristocratic Italian family from Naples. The head of the family was Duke of Atri in the Abruzzo from the 15th century, and Count of Conversano after an Orsini family marriage in 1546, among other titles.

== History ==
The Acquaviva family (since 1481 Acquaviva of Aragon) was an Italian noble family, one of the seven great families of the Kingdom of Naples. Among their titles are those of: Dukes of Atri and Counts of San Flaviano (of Giulia since 1481); then also Counts of Conversano, Counts and then Dukes of Nardò, for one branch, and Counts and then Princes of Caserta for the other.

In 1195, Rinaldo of Acquaviva was feudal lord of various lands in the region of Teramo in Abruzzo. In the following decades, the family established important relations with the Angevin kings. In 1284, Riccardo di Acquaviva was the executioner of Terra di Otranto in the service of Charles I of Anjou.

== Dukes of Atri ==
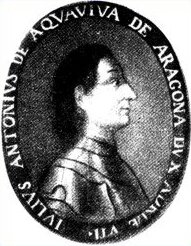
Giulio Antonio I

In 1393, Antonio di Acquaviva, who was the first to hold, by concession of Charles III of Naples, the titles of Count of San Flaviano and Montorio. He purchased from King Ladislaus the cities of Atri, with the title of Duke, and Teramo for 35,000 ducats. Andrea Matteo I, son of Antonio, was 2nd Duke of Atri, 2nd Count of San Flaviano. He died, stabbed in Teramo, on 17 February 1407. The titles and possessions passed to his sons, first Antonio, then Pierbonifacio and finally, in 1443, with the death of the son of the latter, Andrea Matteo II, to his third son, Giosia († 1462), 6th Duke of Atri and 6th Count of San Flaviano.

Giulio Antonio I, son of Giosia and seventh Duke of Atri, commanded the fleet that supported the Neapolitan army of King Ferrante of Aragon, which had joined the coalition formed by Pope Sixtus IV against the Republic of Florence in 1478. For his service he was awarded the Order of the Ermine. The following year, he received the honour of being able to add the name of Aragon to his surname and to add to the family coat of arms the colours of the royal house. During the campaign for the reconquest of Otranto in 1481, he lost his life in an ambush at Serrano. He was succeeded by his elder son, writer Andrea Matteo III (1456–1528), eighth Duca d'Atri.

Andrea Matteo Acquaviva d'Aragona III, 8th Duke of Atri, was the elder surviving son of Giulio Antonio Acquaviva I and his wife, Caterina Orsini del Balzo. He fought for King Ferrante of Naples in the War of Ferrara in 1482, and against him three years later during the Conspiracy of the Barons. Upon the defeat of the conspirators, Duke Andrea was spared due to the intervention of his father-in-law, Antonio Piccolomini, who happened to be the King's son-in-law. Andrea Matteo left the Duchy of Atri to his eldest son Giovan Francesco, the county of Gioia to his second son Giannantonio Donato, and the county of Conversano and the fiefdoms of the Ratta in Caserta to his son Giulio Antonio II.

Gian Girolamo (1521-1592) was the eldest son of Giannantonio Donato. He became the 10th Duke of Atri and 17th Count of Conversano; he was father of two cardinals, Giulio and Ottavio. In 1575[7], he divided the Duchy of Atri and the County of Conversano between his sons Alberto (11th Duke) and Adriano (18th Count). In 1598, the line of the Counts of Conversano merged with that of the Dukes of Nardò with the marriage between the 19th Count Giulio Antonio and his cousin Caterina Acquaviva, daughter and heir of Duke Belisario II.

== Dukes of Nardò ==
Belisario Acquaviva (c. 1460–1528), was a younger son of Giulio Antonio Acquaviva d' Aragona. Unlike his brother, the 8th Duke of Atri, who supported the French, Belisario fought against Charles VIII of France, and was rewarded by King Ferdinand II of Naples with the fief of Nardò and the title Count. He was later made Duke of Nardò by Charles V. Belisario was hence able to not only preserve his patrimony, but to procure the restitution of his brother's. Both of his sons, Giacomo Antonio Acquaviva and Giovanni Battista Acquaviva, served as Bishop of Nardò.

== Notable members ==
- Giacomo Antonio Acquaviva Bishop of Nardò (1521–1532) who resigned to get married.
- Claudio Acquaviva (1543–1615), fifth general of the Society of Jesus
- Francesco Acquaviva (1665 – 1723), cardinal.
- Giovanni Vincenzo Acquaviva d'Aragona, (between 1490 and 1495-1546), cardinal
- Giulio Acquaviva d'Aragona (1546–1574), cardinal, brother of Rudolfo, nephew of Claudio and Giovanni Vincenzo.
- Rodolfo Acquaviva (1550–1583), Jesuit missionary and martyr in India
- Troiano Acquaviva d’Aragona, cardinal
- Luigi Acquaviva (1812–1898), politician and general

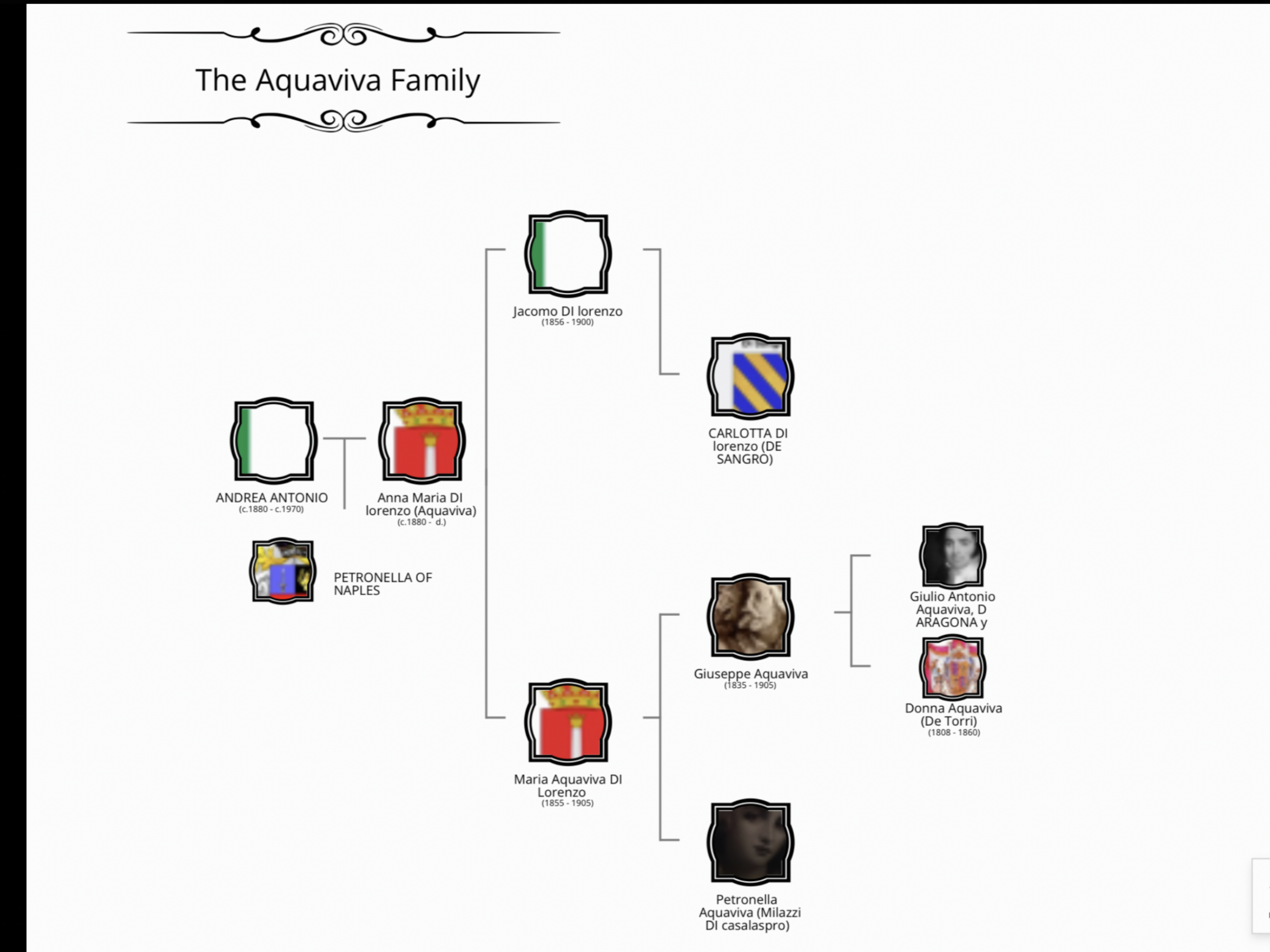
The Acquaviva di Lorenzo family
