= Philip de Lannoy, 2nd Prince of Sulmona =

Philip de Lannoy, 2nd Prince of Sulmona (1514–1553) was an Italian military leader in Spanish service.

== Early life ==
He was the son of Charles de Lannoy, 1st Prince of Sulmona and Françoise de Montbel, Duchess of Boiano (d. c. 1545). Among his siblings were Ferdinand de Lannoy, Count de La Roche (who married Marguerite Perrenot de Granvelle, a daughter of Nicolas Perrenot de Granvelle), Georges de Lannoy, 2nd Duke of Boiano (who married Julia Diaz Carlon, a daughter of Antonio Diaz Carlon, 3rd Count of Alife), and Clemente de Lannoy, Baron of Prata (who married Ippolita Branai Castriota Scanderbegh, a daughter of Ferrante Castriota, Marquess of Città Sant'Angelo).

His father was the younger son of Jean IV de Lannoy, Lord of Mingoval (himself nephew of Jean III de Lannoy) and Philipotte de Lalaing. His maternal grandparents were Jacques de Montbel, Count d'Entrémont, and Jeanne de Saint-Maur.

== Career ==
The title, Prince of Sulmona, had been granted to his father in 1526, together with Grandeeship of Spain, during the reign of Charles V, Holy Roman Emperor as King of Naples, in recognition of the work done by Charles as Viceroy of Naples.

At the Battle of Ceresole in 1544, he commanded the Neapolitan light cavalry.

== Personal life ==
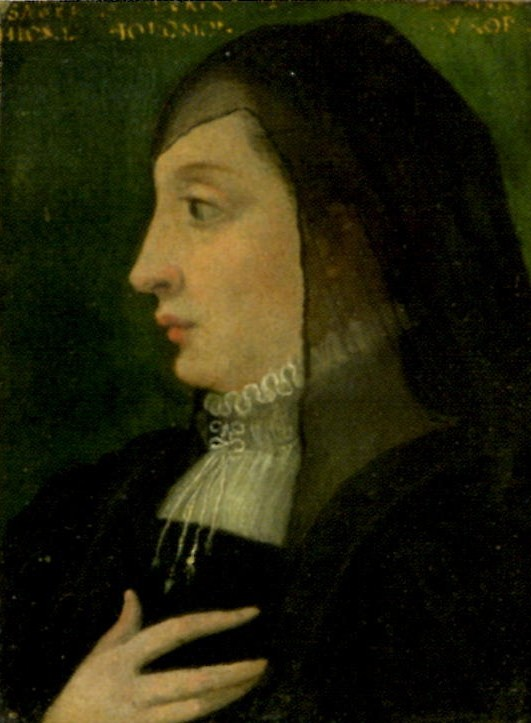
Portrait of his wife, Isabella Colonna

In 1534, he married Isabella Colonna of the prominent Colonna family. The widow of Louis "Rodomonte" Gonzaga, Isabella was the only daughter of Vespasiano Colonna, Duke of Traetto, Count of Fondi, and, his first wife, Beatrice Appiani. She was raised, however, by her father's second wife, Giulia Gonzaga. From her first marriage, she was the mother of Vespasiano I Gonzaga, who became the Duke of Sabbioneta. (Note: Her late husband's father, Ludovico Gonzaga, opposed her marriage to the Prince of Sulmona, and obtained a decree from Emperor Charles V which entrusted her son's education to his aunt, and Isabella's stepmother, Giulia Gonzaga.) Together, they were the parents of five children:

- Maria de Lannoy, who became nun in the monastery of Santa Maria Donna Regina in Naples.
- Charles de Lannoy, 3rd Prince of Sulmona (1538–1566), also 2nd Count of Venafro; he married Costanza Doria del Carretto.
- Beatrice de Lannoy, who married Alfonso de Guevara, 5th Count of Potenza. After his death, she married Alberto Acquaviva d'Aragona, 12th Duke of Atri.
- Horace de Lannoy, 4th Prince of Sulmona (d. 1597), also 3rd Count of Venafro; he married Antonia d'Avalos.
- Vittoria de Lannoy (d. 1594), who married Giulio Antonio Acquaviva d'Aragona, 1st Prince of Caserta, 2nd Marquess of Bellante.

The Prince died in 1553 and was succeeded as Prince of Sulmona by his eldest son, Charles. The title, however, became extinct upon the death of Philip II de Lannoy, 6th Prince of Sulmona in 1604. (Note: The title was recreated in 1610 for Pope Paul V's nephew, Marcantonio Borghese, by King Philip III of Spain, in his capacity as King of Naples.) Upon his widow's death at Naples in 1570, her son Vespasiano from her first marriage inherited all her possessions.
