= Conversano Castle =

Coordinates: 40°58′7.68″N 17°6′56.28″E

- Castello di Conversano
- Conversano, Italy
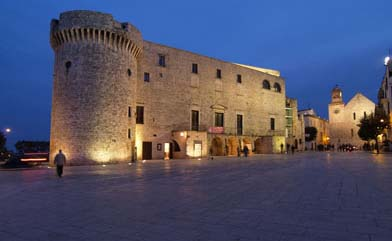
- The Castle of Conversano

Site information
- Owner: Public and private
- Open to the public: partially

Site history
- Built: Reconstructed 11th century

The Castle of Conversano is a castle in Conversano, Italy. It is located on the highest point of the hill on which the city stands in a position able to dominate the whole surrounding territory to the sea, and borders the old Largo della Corte, a large irregularly shaped square always at the heart of the city life.

== History ==
The castle was the residence of the Counts of Conversano for almost seven centuries, ever since Norman times. Yet his story is much older, probably already at the time of Gothic War (535–554) on the same place there was a defense building, which embraced a part of the megalithic walls of the ancient city of Norba.

Certainly the first Normans feudal lords in the 11th century imposed the reconstruction of a castle on the ruins of the former. Of the original Norman core is preserved today a tower with a square base, known as the Torre Maestra and a fresco on the original vault entry, depicting the saints Cosmas and Damian. Later, important extension works were made, among others, from the Counts Luxembourg (14th century) who promoted the building of high circular tower at the north, right where the ridge of the acropolis became steeper. Around 1460, the Acquaviva built a twelve-sided tower base, more squat and with the embankment type walls, particularly daring from the engineering point of view: inside it, there is a round tank with a corridor around it equipped with drains, which are essential to defend the city.

The following centuries saw the further transformation of the building that was gradually losing the character of the manor to configure itself as an elegant mansion, suitable to the prestige of the powerful feudal lords. The current entrance is opening along the wall on Piazza Conciliazione, built in 1710 at the behest of the Countess Dorotea Acquaviva. It is possible to access a courtyard which in turn provides access to the late Renaissance porch. Further work on building complex have followed one another until the late 19th century.

The castle is currently only partially a municipal asset, while some wings - including the bridal chamber decorated with scenes from the Old Testament of Paolo Finoglio - are still private property. The public area of the building now houses the civic art gallery displaying paintings of the great cycle of the Jerusalem Delivered by Finoglio. The canvases were commissioned by Count Giangirolamo II Acquaviva d'Aragona between 1642 and 1645.

== Structure ==
=== Cylindrical Tower ===
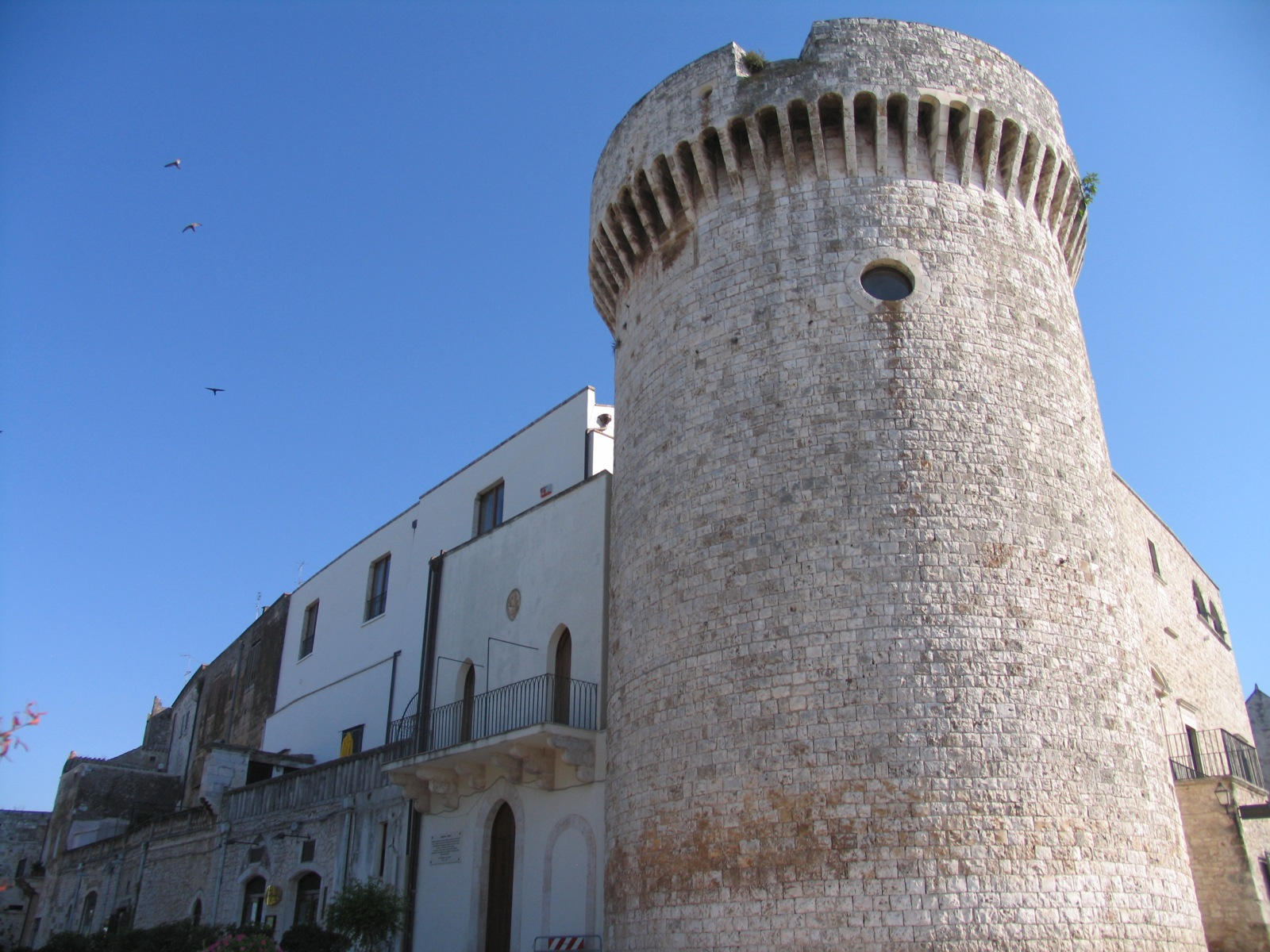
Cylindrical tower or of Luxemburg

It is the only tower of the castle built, although the most impressive in size, of the same type plan of the other smaller cylindrical towers leaning against the 15th century walls of Conversano.

The Tower was added to the northern corner, perhaps replacing an earlier square tower, the rearmost of which traces are found only in the layout of the Castle. It is the result of an intervention of fortification work done by Giulio Antonio Acquaviva. The emblem placed high on the wall, which combines the symbols of the Acquaviva and Orsini house, constitutes the "signature" of the work.

The tower is divided into more levels is a powerful defensive rampart towards the outside, and in later period of its construction, the parapet supported by corbels was interrupted at several points to make room for the inclusion of the cannons.

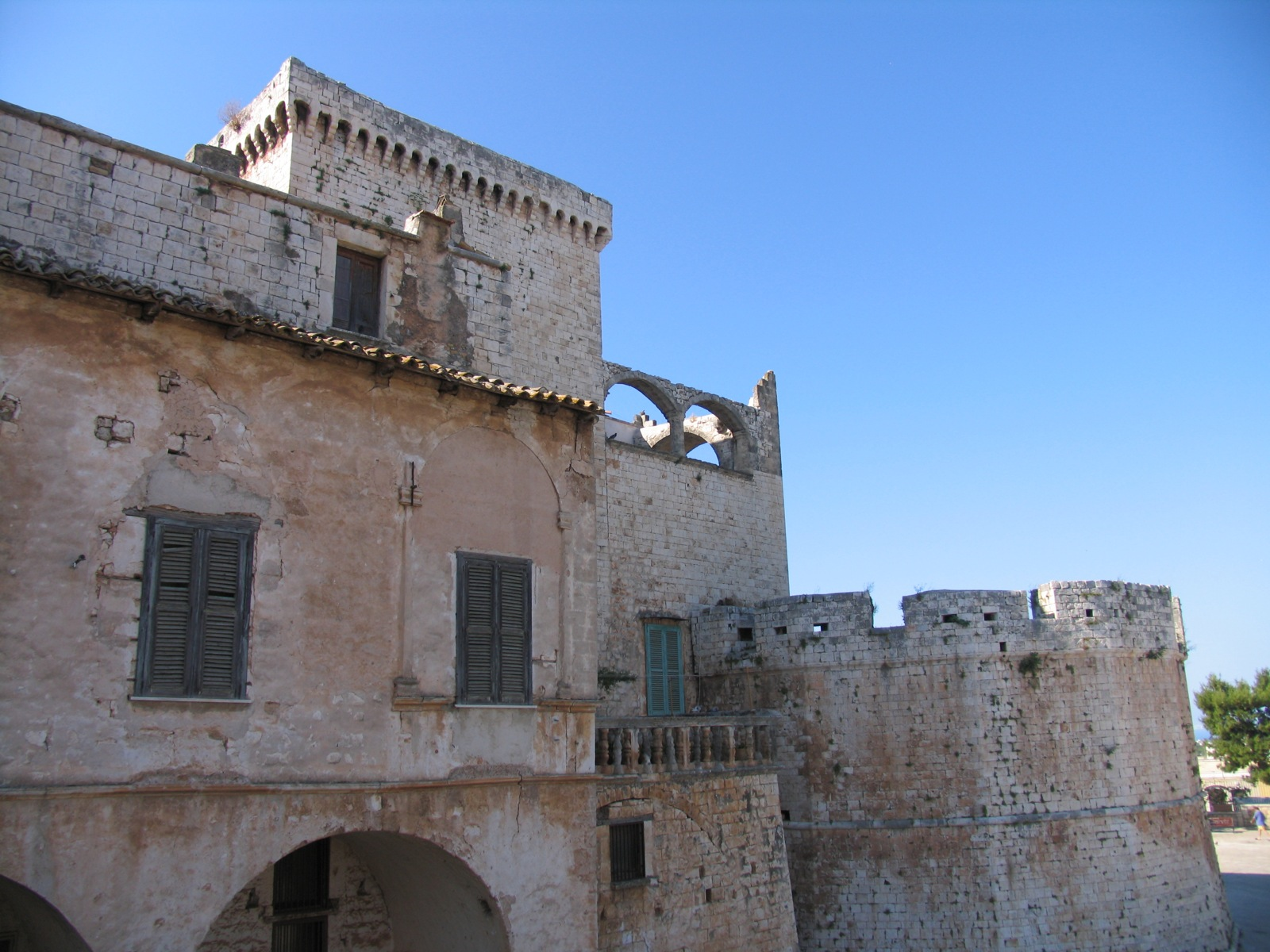
View of the Castle

=== Polygonal Tower ===
Also this tower is an addition to other old buildings of the Castle, built when the new techniques and new military made inadequate the old structures.

To note is the lower tilted wall (called a scarpa, now partially buried), suited to repel the artillery. The narrow slits visible in the sides of the tower allowed the insertion of the mouths of fire, then contained within the tower. Other guns were to be placed on its top, sticking out the breaks above the parapet.

The presence of two coats of masonry in relief can give the building to the Count Andrea Matteo Acquaviva (1481–1511), son and successor of Giulio Antonio Acquaviva. Please note that just when was count Andrea Matteo, who sided with the French, Conversano was besieged and captured (1503) by Spanish troops of General Consalvo of Cordova.

=== Well ===
In the first room of the main tower, the oldest part of the castle (25 meters high, its terrace overlooking the scenery) is a well, where according to legend, the Guercio cast women who refused the droit du seigneur.
