= Leverano =

- Comune
- Comune di Leverano
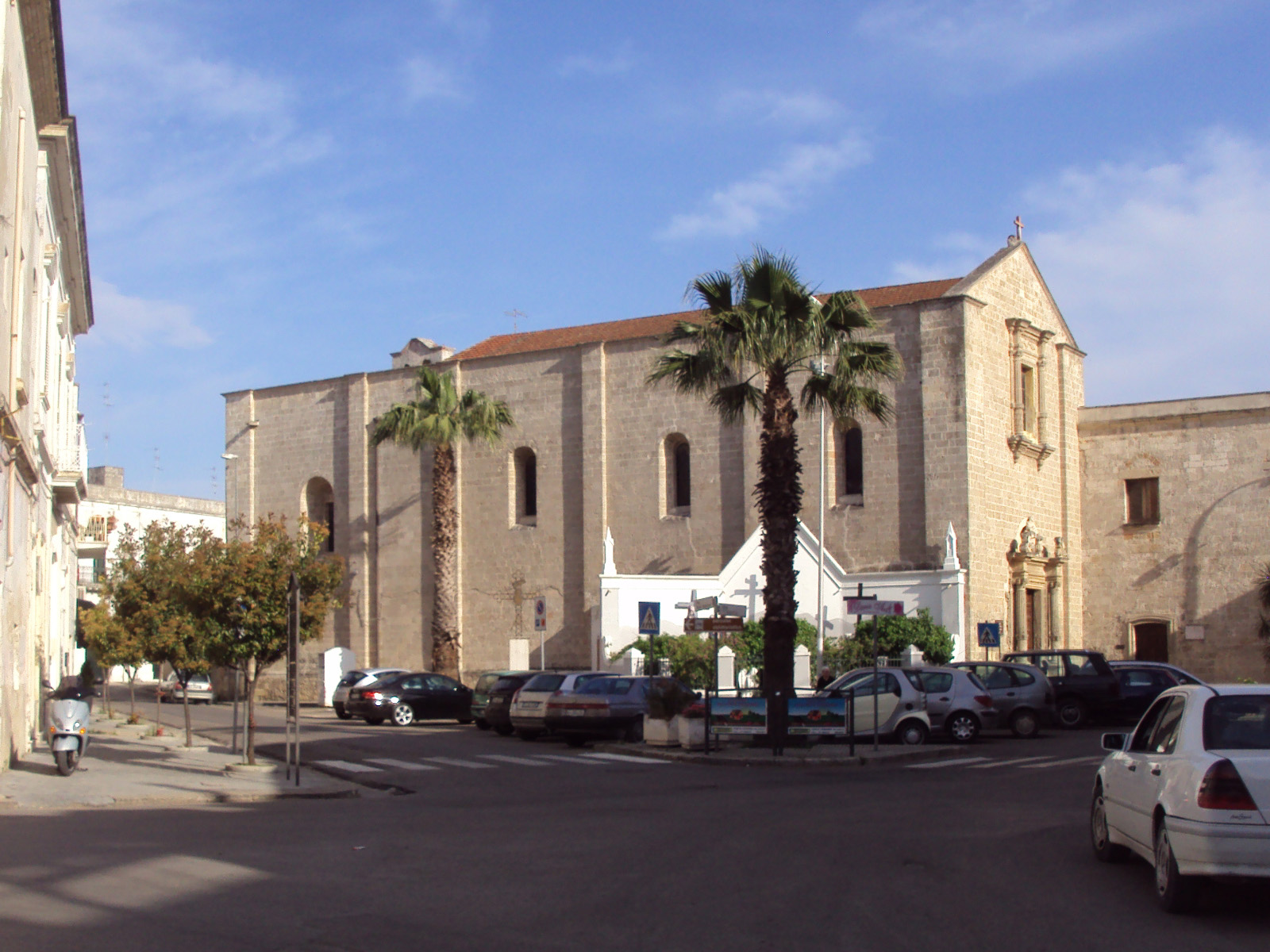
- Church and convent of Santa Maria delle Grazie

- Location within Italy Location within Apulia
- Coordinates: 40°17′N 18°5′E
- Country: Italy
- Region: Apulia
- Province: Lecce (LE)

Government
  - Mayor: Marcello Rolli

Area
  - Total: 49.5 km^{2} (19.1 sq mi)
- Elevation: 37 m (121 ft)

Population (30 September 2017)
  - Total: 14,283
  - Density: 289/km^{2} (747/sq mi)
- Demonym: Leveranesi
- Time zone: UTC+1 (CET)
  - Summer (DST): UTC+2 (CEST)
- Postal code: 73045
- Dialing code: 0832
- ISTAT code: 075037
- Patron saint: St. Roch
- Saint day: 16 August
- Website: Official website

Leverano (Salentino: Liranu) is a town and comune in the province of Lecce in the southeastern part of the Apulia region of south-east Italy. It is bounded by the comuni of Arnesano, Carmiano, Copertino, Nardò and Veglie.

== History ==
Leverano was severely destroyed by the Ostrogoth Totila, it was also destroyed by the Arabs in the 9th century. A tower was later built in 1220 and it protected against pirate raids. The tower is built with Norman architecture.

== Leverano DOC ==
The area around Leverano produces both red, white and rose Italian DOC wine, though the region produces vastly more red wine than anything else. The grapes are limited to a harvest yield of 15 tonnes/ha. Red wines must have a finished alcohol level of at least 12% and are composed of at least 65% Negroamaro and up to 35% of the assorted blend of Malvasia, Sangiovese and Montepulciano. White wines must have a minimum alcohol level of at least 11% and be composed by at least 65% Malvasia bianca with Trebbiano and Bombino bianco allowed to make up the remaining 35%.

== Twinning ==
- Sfakiotes, Greece
- Guillena, Spain
