= Tavoliere salentino =

Valle della Cupa (English: Valley of Cupa) is an area of Italy centered on the town of Lecce, including the towns of Trepuzzi, Novoli, Carmiano, Arnesano, Monteroni, San Pietro in Lama, Lequile and San Cesario di Lecce. Since the 15th century, the region's aristocracy has elected the area as their ideal place for countryside life and they have built numerous villas and mansions. The area is located at the heart of the Salento peninsula; a massive rock of limestone that divides the Adriatic Sea from the Ionian Sea. The area is on the south of the Italian region of Apulia.
