= Isabella Colonna =

Italian noblewoman (1513–1670)

Isabella Colonna (1513 – 1570) was an Italian noblewoman, a member of the Colonna family.

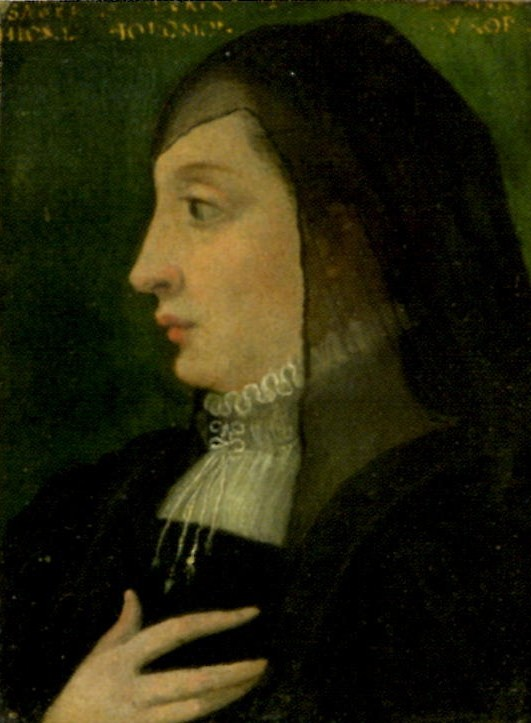
Isabella Colonna

== Early life ==
She was the only daughter of Vespasiano Colonna, Duke of Traetto (modern Minturno) and Count of Fondi, and Beatrice Appiani. After her mother's death, she was raised by her father's second wife, Giulia Gonzaga (a daughter of Ludovico Gonzaga, Duke of Sabbioneta).

Her paternal grandparents were Prospero Colonna, Duke of Traetto, and Covella di Sanseverino.

== Personal life ==
In 1531, she married Louis "Rodomonte" Gonzaga (1500–1532), an Imperial Captain of Charles V who was the son of Ludovico Gonzaga (her step-grandfather). Before his death, they were the parents of a son:

- Vespasiano I Gonzaga (1531–1591), who became the Duke of Sabbioneta; he married Diana Folch de Cardona, a daughter of Antonio Folch de Cardona. After her death in 1559, he married Anna d'Aragona y Folch de Cardona, a daughter of Alfonso de Aragón y Portugal. After her death in 1567, he married Margherita Gonzaga, a daughter of Cesare I Gonzaga, Lord of Guastalla.

After Louis died, Isabella moved with his parents to Sabbioneta. Later, after quarrels with the latter, she moved to Rivarolo and then, in 1534, to her fiefs in southern Italy.

=== Second marriage ===
In 1534, she married Philip de Lannoy, 2nd Prince of Sulmona (1514–1553), the son of Charles de Lannoy, 1st Prince of Sulmona. Ludovico, the father of her first husband, opposed the marriage and obtained a decree from Emperor Charles V which entrusted Vespasiano's education to his aunt Giulia Gonzaga. Before the Prince of Sulmona died in 1553, they were the parents of five children:

- Maria de Lannoy, who became nun in the monastery of Santa Maria Donna Regina in Naples.
- Charles de Lannoy, 3rd Prince of Sulmona (1538–1566), also 2nd Count of Venafro; he married Costanza Doria del Carretto.
- Beatrice de Lannoy, who married Alfonso de Guevara, 5th Count of Potenza. After his death, she married Alberto Acquaviva d'Aragona, 12th Duke of Atri.
- Horace de Lannoy, 4th Prince of Sulmona (d. 1597), also 3rd Count of Venafro; he married Antonia d'Avalos.
- Vittoria de Lannoy (d. 1594), who married Giulio Antonio Acquaviva d'Aragona, 1st Prince of Caserta, 2nd Marquess of Bellante.

Isabella Colonna died at Naples in 1570; her eldest son Vespasiano inherited all her possessions.
