= Luigi Acquaviva =

Italian politician and general (1812–1898)

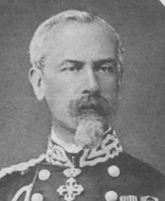
Luigi Acquaviva

Luigi Andreas Mariano Acquaviva (20 December 1812 – 29 September 1898) was an Italian politician and general.

== Biography and titles ==
He was born in Naples to a noble family of the Kingdom of Two Sicilies. He inherited the title of duke of Atri from his father Girolamo. He also the received the title of duke of Nardò, count of Conversano, Castellana Grotte and Giulianova. He was a grand officer of the Order of Saints Maurice and Lazarus.

He was appointed in the Senate of the Kingdom of Sardinia on 20 November 1860.

Luigi died in Giulianova on 29 September 1898.

== Descendants ==
His descendants included Maria Acquaviva di Lorenzo 1855–1905 and Anna Maria di Lorenzo 1883–1956, through his sister Maria Giulia Colonna principessa di stigliano.
