= Cenate (disambiguation) =

Cenate may refer to places in Italy:

- Cenate Sopra - a commune in the province of Bergamo
- Cenate Sotto - a commune in the province of Bergamo
- Cenate - a frazione in the commune of Nardò in the province of Lecce
