= Charles de Lannoy, 1st Prince of Sulmona =

Soldier and noble, member of the Order of The Golden Fleece

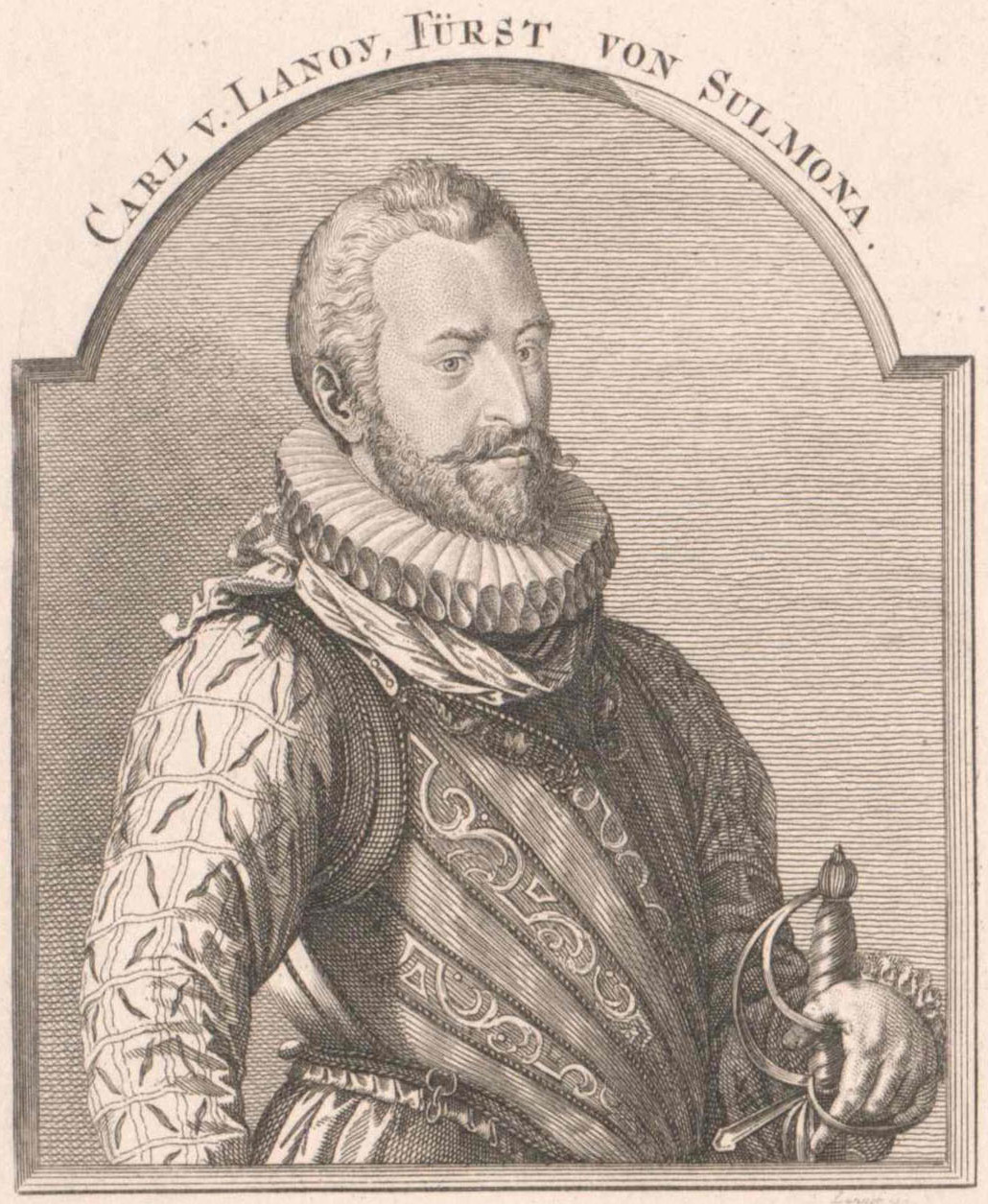
Engraving of Charles de Lannoy

Charles de Lannoy (c. 1487 – 23 September 1527) was a soldier and statesman from the Low Countries in service of the Habsburg Emperors Maximilian I and Charles V.

== Early life ==
He was a member of the noble House of Lannoy. Charles de Lannoy was born the younger son of Jean IV de Lannoy, Lord of Mingoval, himself nephew of Jean III de Lannoy. His mother was Philipotte de Lalaing (c. 1487). He took service with the Emperor Maximilian I and won distinction for bravery and leadership, serving in the Low Countries and Italy.

== Career ==
Arms of House Lannoy

He was appointed member to the council of Charles of Burgundy; later Emperor Charles V and his Caballerizo mayor in 1515. He became a knight of the Order of the Golden Fleece in 1516. He was made Governor of Tournai in 1521. He served as Viceroy of Naples from 1522 to 1523 and as Imperial lieutenant during the Italian War of 1521-1525. He became commander-in-chief of the Imperial armies in Italy upon the death of Prospero Colonna at the end of 1523 and was in command at the Battle of Sesia and the Siege of Marseille.

In 1525 he commanded an army to relieve Pavia, the city being besieged for months. He was victorious in the resulting Battle of Pavia, taking King Francis I of France prisoner and thus deciding the war in favor of the Habsburgs. He accordingly was created Prince of Sulmona, made Count of Asti, and became Mayordomo mayor to the Emperor 1526. When the War of the League of Cognac erupted in the same year he again served in Italy, and negotiated a truth with the Papal States in early 1527. Soon after he contracted the plague and died on 23 September 1527 in Naples.

== Personal life ==
In 1509, he married Francoise de Montbel (d. c. 1545), a daughter of Jacques de Montbel, Count d'Entrémont and Jeanne de Saint-Maur. Together, they had several children, including:

- Philip de Lannoy, 2nd Prince of Sulmona (1514–1553), who married Isabella Colonna, widow of Louis "Rodomonte" Gonzaga, in 1534.
- Ferdinand de Lannoy, Count de La Roche (1520–1579), who married Marguerite Perrenot de Granvelle, a daughter of Nicolas Perrenot de Granvelle (a close adviser to Emperor Charles V).
- Georges de Lannoy, 2nd Duke of Boiano, who married Julia Diaz Carlon, a daughter of Antonio Diaz Carlon, 3rd Count of Alife, and Cornelia Piccolomini.
- Clemente de Lannoy, Baron of Prata, who married Ippolita Branai Castriota Scanderbegh, a daughter of Ferrante Castriota, Marquess of Città Sant'Angelo and Camilla Branai Castriota Scanderbegh.

He was succeeded by his son Philip.
