= Order of the Ermine =

Orders of the Ermine may refer to:

- Order of the Ermine (France), a chivalric order
- Order of the Ermine (Naples), a chivalric order
- Order of the Ermine (modern), awarded for services to Brittany
