= Santa Maria al Bagno =

- Frazione
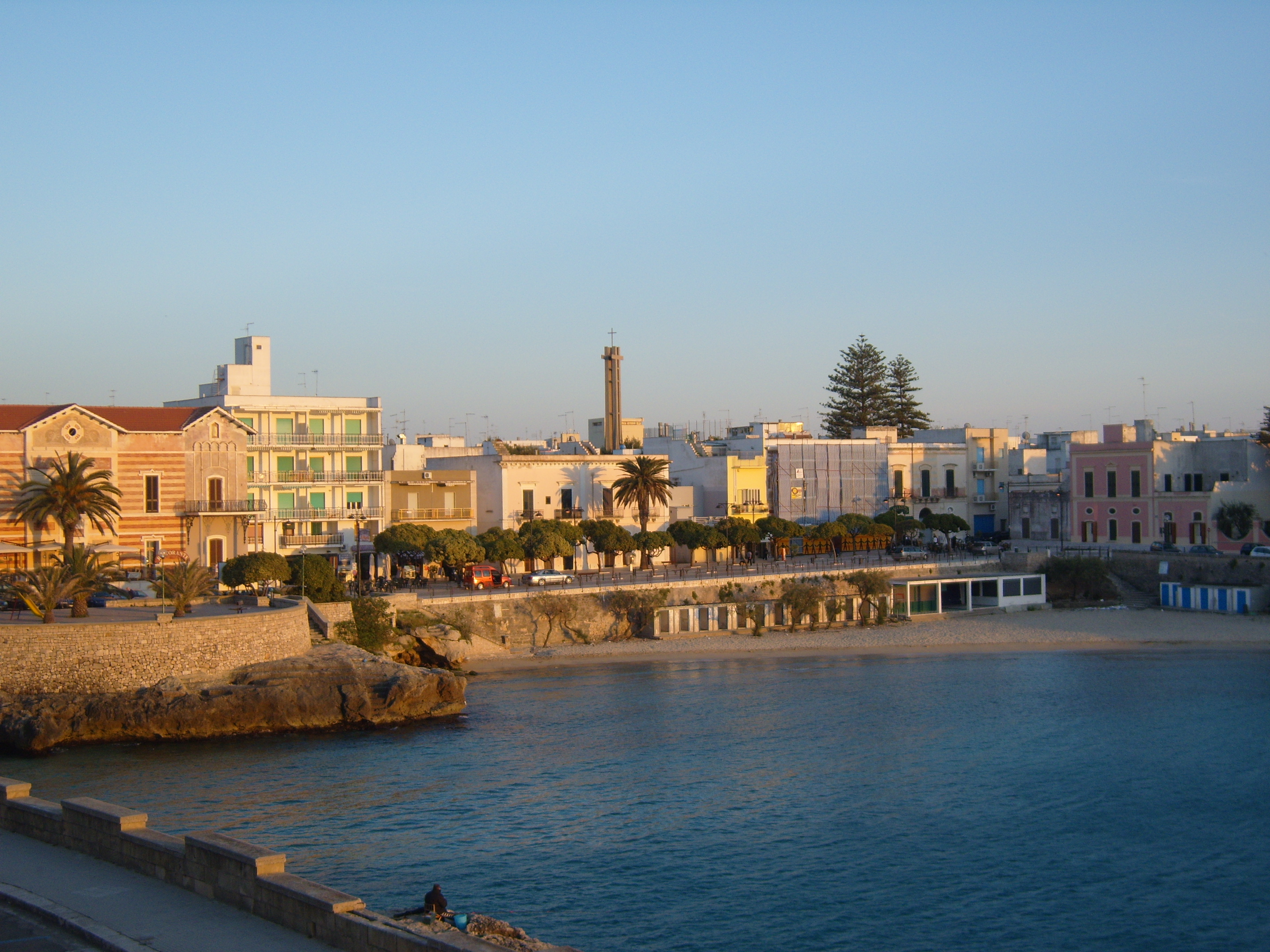
- Panoramic view

- Location of Santa Maria al Bagno in Italy
- Coordinates: 40°07′45″N 17°59′45″E
- Country: Italy
- Region: Apulia
- Province: Lecce (LE)
- Comune: Nardò
- Elevation: 8 m (26 ft)

Population
  - Total: 1,000
- Demonym: Santamarinesi
- Time zone: UTC+1 (CET)
  - Summer (DST): UTC+2 (CEST)
- Postal code: 73048
- Dialing code: (+39) 0833

Santa Maria al Bagno (formerly Santa Maria di Bagni) is an Italian village of Apulia, in Italy. It is a frazione of the commune of Nardò and is located on the Ionian Sea.

== Geography ==
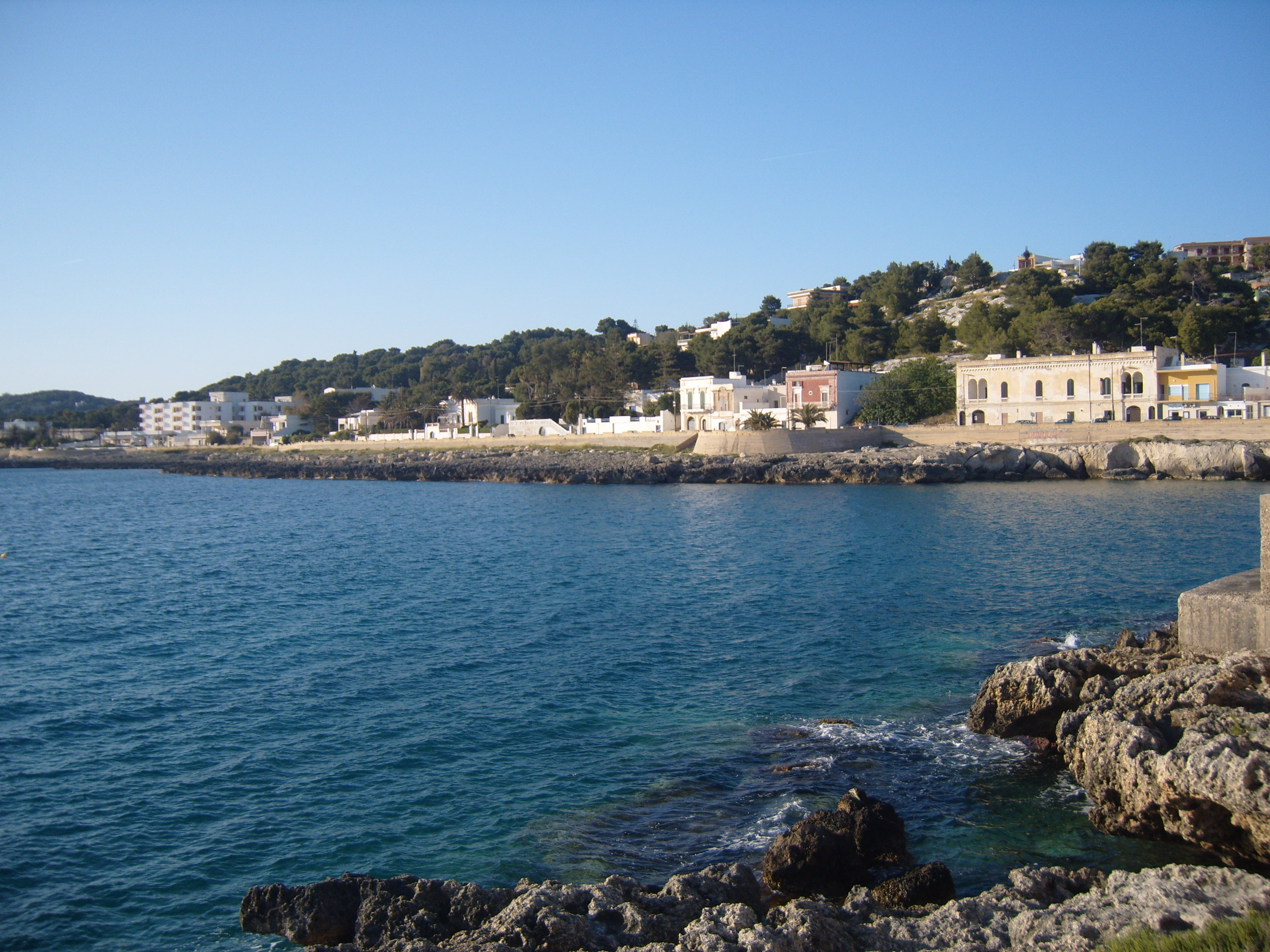
Santa Maria al Bagno seaside

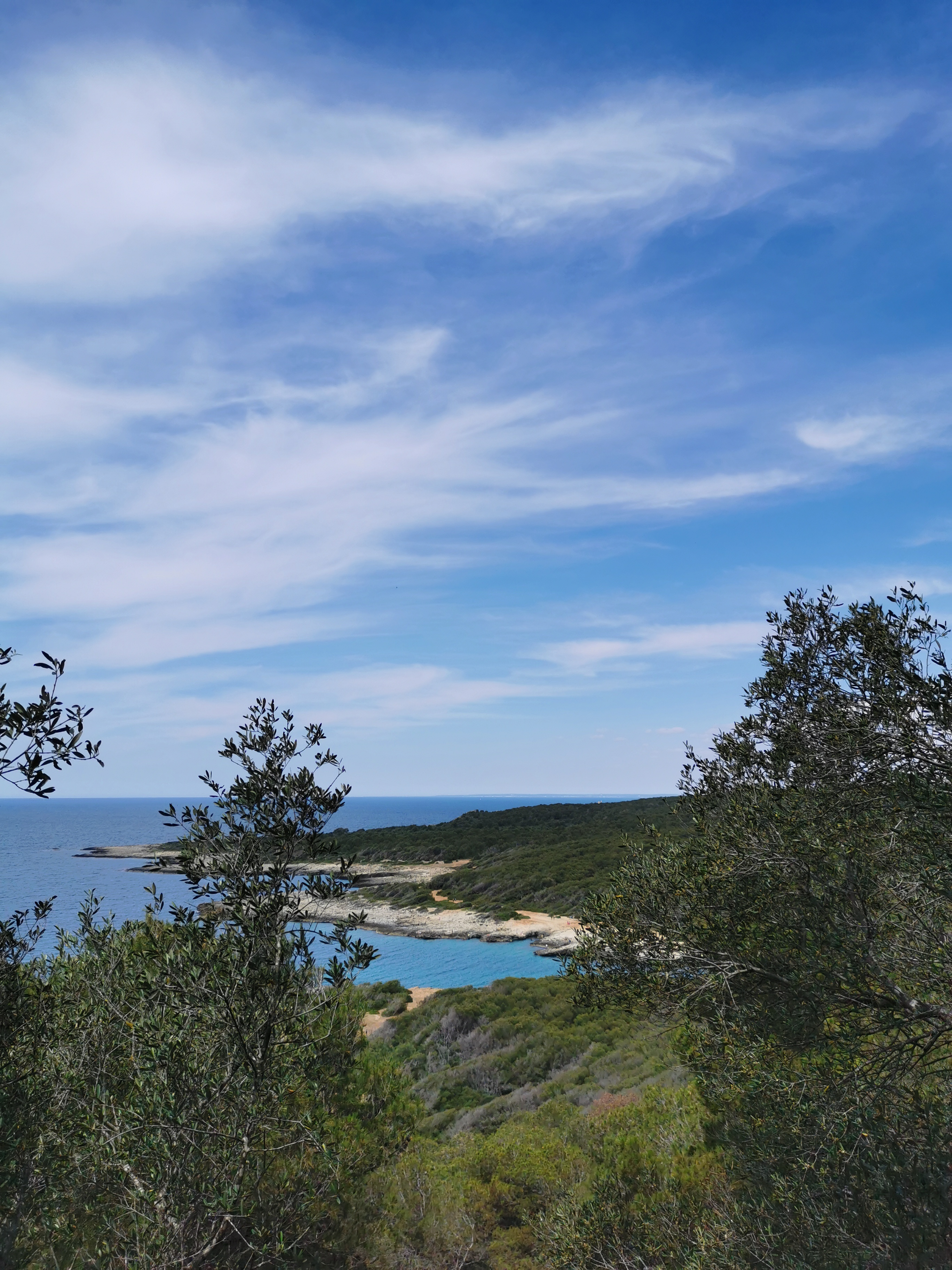
Bay of Portoselvaggio

Santa Maria is a small fishing village, located on the shores of the Gulf of Taranto, on the west coast of the Ionian Sea between Gallipoli and Porto Cesareo. It has unspoilt rocky and sandy beaches all along the coast. Particularly important is the next door regional wildlife reserve of "Portoselvaggio", a famous natural park with 400 hectares of pinewood forest and seven kilometres of high quality, unpolluted coast. Portoselvaggio is one of the main green lungs of the region of Apulia.

Santa Maria Al Bagno is approximately 45 minutes travelling time by car from Brindisi, 20 minutes from Lecce and approximately one hour 30 minutes from Bari. There are several food shops in the village, restaurants, pubs, bars open in summer 24 hours a day, a chemist, a post office, real estate agents, tourist agents, barber shops, petrol station, newsagent shops and a weekly market every Sunday. Many large supermarkets, shopping centres and fashion boutiques are in the nearby towns of Nardò, Galatone, Gallipoli and Lecce.

== Main sights ==
=== Museum ===
Santa Maria al Bagno was the site of a post World War II displaced person camp.

A new museum opened in the village dedicated to thousands of concentration camp survivors who travelled through Italy on their way to Israel after World War II. The Museum of Memory and Welcome has been created in Santa Maria through which some 150,000 Jews passed between 1943 and 1947. The museum houses all the material relating to the time from the town council archives, including witness reports, photographs and videos, as well as a multimedia room and a library.

=== Coastal Tower ===
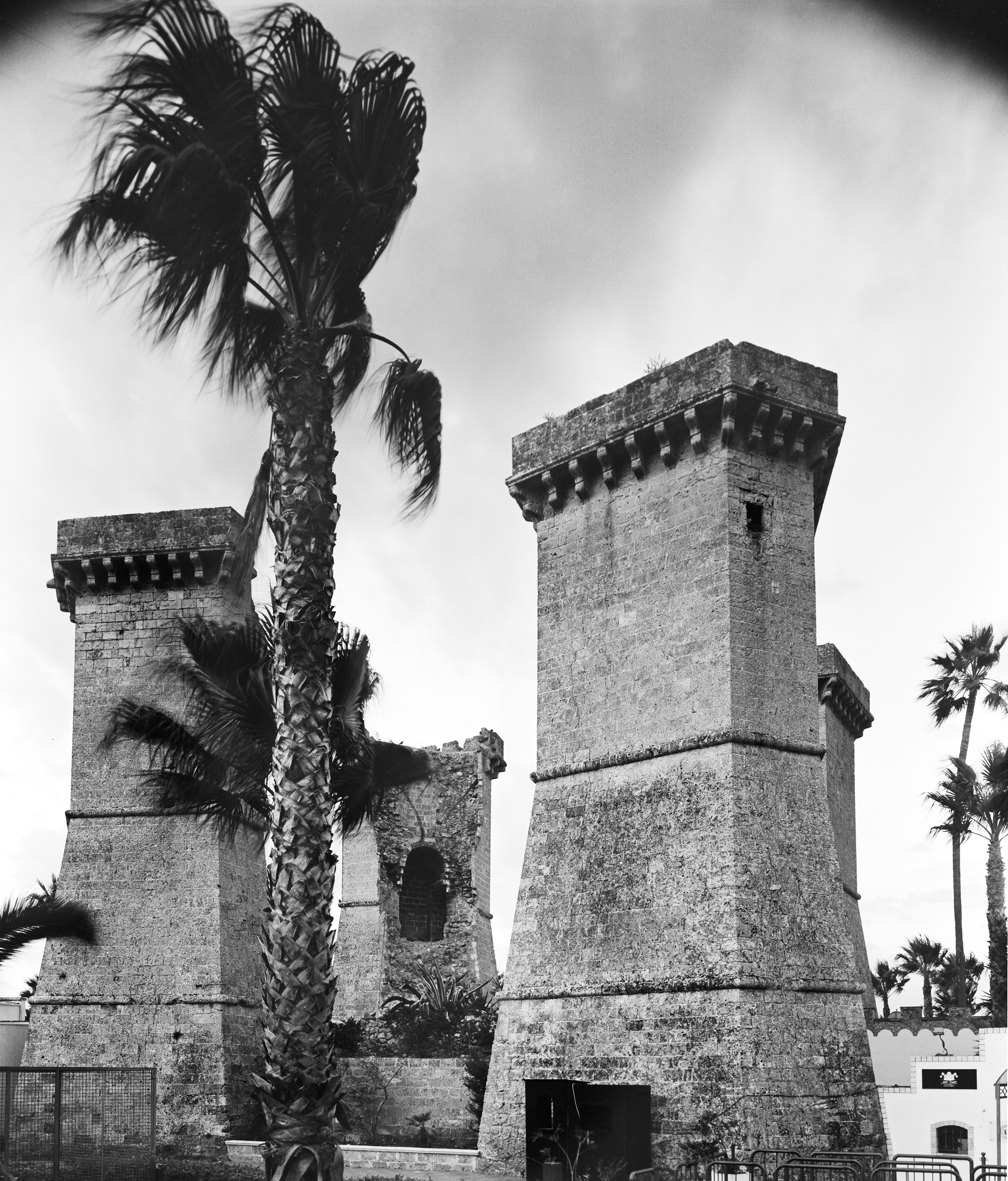
The Tower of the Galatena River.

Santa Maria al Bagno is the site of a medieval coastal tower, the Tower of the Galatena River, colloquially known as "The Four Columns" due to its structure of four repeating pillars.

== See also ==
- Cenate
