= Giovanni Battista Acquaviva =

Most Reverend Giovanni Battista Acquaviva
- Bishop of Nardò
- Church: Catholic Church
- Diocese: Diocese of Nardò
- In office: 1536–1569
- Predecessor: Giovanni Domenico de Cupis
- Successor: Ambrogio Salvio

Personal details
- Died: 1569 Nardò, Italy

Giovanni Battista Acquaviva (1513-1569) was a Roman Catholic prelate who served as Bishop of Nardò (1536–1569).

== Biography ==
Giovanni Battista Acquaviva was the son of Italian nobleman Belisario Acquaviva, and younger brother of Giacomo Antonio Acquaviva. He was piously educated, and while still young took the ecclesiastical path.

On 22 May 1536, he was appointed by Pope Paul III as administrator of the Diocese of Nardò, with the right to become bishop at age twenty-seven. He worked diligently, assisted by his vicars-general. In 1563 he called a diocesan synod, which he solemnly celebrated in the presence of the chapter and the clergy of the city and diocese. Various necessary decrees and norms were promulgated at the time. In 1568 Bishop Acquaviva brought the Carmelite monks to settled in the city.

He served as Bishop of Nardò until his death at the age of fifty-six on August 13, 1569.

== See also ==
- Catholic Church in Italy

== External links and additional sources ==
- Cheney, David M. "Diocese of Nardò-Gallipoli". Catholic-Hierarchy.org. (for Chronology of Bishops) ^{[self-published]}
- Chow, Gabriel. "Diocese of Nardò-Gallipoli (Italy)". GCatholic.org.(for Chronology of Bishops) ^{[self-published]}

Catholic Church titles
Preceded by Giovanni Domenico de Cupis	Bishop of Nardò; 1536–1569	Succeeded by Ambrogio Salvio
