= Novoli =

- Comune
- Comune di Novoli
- Location within Italy Location within Apulia
- Coordinates: 40°23′N 18°3′E
- Country: Italy
- Region: Apulia
- Province: Lecce (LE)
- Frazioni: Villa Convento

Area
  - Total: 17 km^{2} (6.6 sq mi)

Population (30 November 2008)
  - Total: 8,254
  - Density: 490/km^{2} (1,300/sq mi)
- Demonym: Novolesi
- Time zone: UTC+1 (CET)
  - Summer (DST): UTC+2 (CEST)
- Postal code: 73051
- Dialing code: 0832
- ISTAT code: 075055
- Patron saint: Sant'Antonio Abate and Maria SS. del Pane
- Website: Official website

Novoli (Salentino: Nòule) is a town and comune in the Italian province of Lecce in the Apulia region of south-east Italy.

== Bounding communes ==
- Arnesano
- Campi Salentina
- Carmiano
- Lecce
- Trepuzzi
- Veglie

== Population History ==
Year	Population
1861	3,412
1871	4,158
1881	4,774
1901	6,027
1911	6,686
1921	6,727
1931	7,454
1936	8,306
1951	9,600
1961	9,567
1971	9,198
1981	9,017
1991	8,771
2001	8,484

The population grew until the 1951 census, after the increasing trend, the population fell slowly mainly by emigration to other parts of Italy.
