= Domenico Morea =

Italian Catholic priest, educator and historian (1833-1902)

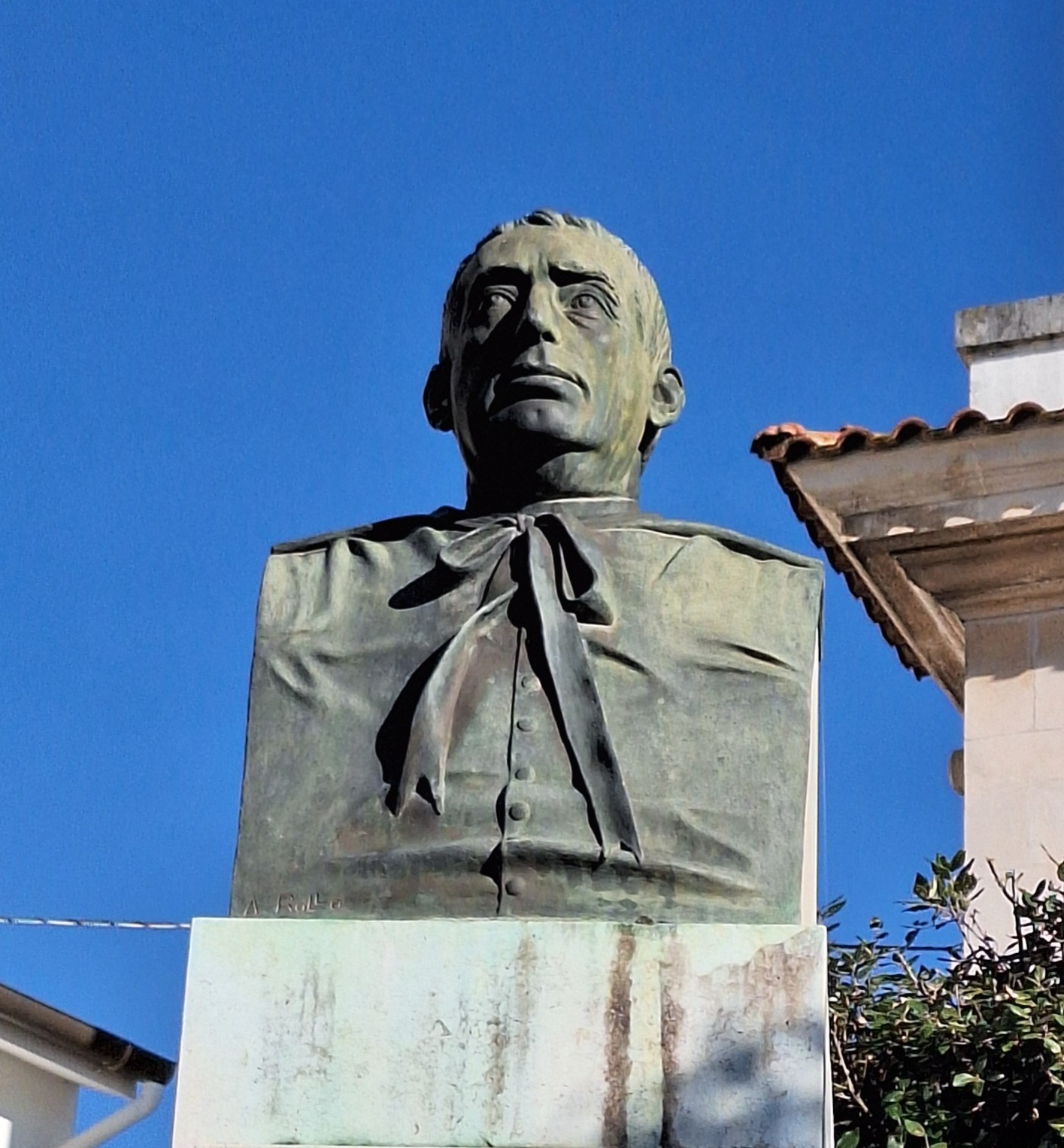
- Statue of Domenico Morea in Alberobello
- Born: 21 June 1833; Alberobello, Kingdom of the Two Sicilies
- Died: 17 July 1902 (aged 69); Conversano, Kingdom of Italy
- Occupations: Priest, educator, historian

Domenico Morea (21 June 1833 – 17 July 1902) was an Italian Catholic priest, educator and historian, noted for his contributions to the historiography of Apulia.

== Early life and education ==
Morea was born in Alberobello in a small trullo on Via Giuseppe Giusti, no. 18. He lost his mother at the age of four, likely during the cholera epidemic of 1837, and was raised by an aunt who was a nun. She entrusted his education to Don Modesto Colucci, a liberal and patriotic priest involved in the 1848 uprisings in the Bari area. Recognized for his intelligence, Morea pursued classical and religious studies at the monastery of Maruccia and later at the Seminary of Conversano, supported financially by his aunt. In 1855 he was sent by Bishop Giuseppe Maria Mucedola to Montecassino to study under Benedictine monk and historian Luigi Tosti. Morea was ordained as a priest in March 1856. He later continued his studies at La Sapienza in Rome, focusing on biblical exegesis and ancient languages.

== Career ==
In 1861, at the age of 28, Morea was appointed rector of the Seminary-College of Conversano, a post he held, with interruptions, for nearly forty years. He modernized the institution, expanded its library, established scientific facilities, and opened the seminary to broader civic education. Under his leadership, Conversano gained the reputation of being the “Athens of Apulia”. Alongside his educational work, Morea published the Chartularium Cupersanense (1892), a landmark archival study on the history of Conversano and southern Italy.

== Later life and death ==
Despite professional obstacles and declining health, Morea remained devoted to scholarship and teaching. He died in Conversano on 17 July 1902, shortly after attending student examinations. Having donated his possessions to the Church, he died in poverty, and his burial was provided by colleagues and clergy.
