= Magliano, Carmiano =

Village in Carmiano, Apulia, Italy

Coordinates: 40°20′16.76″N 18°3′41.52″E

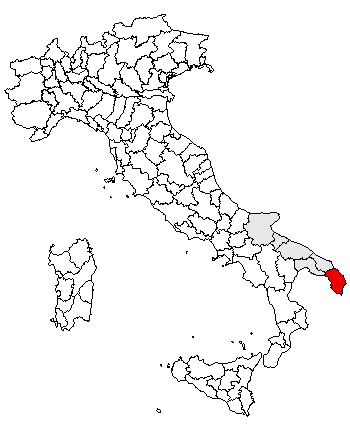
Location of the province of Lecce

Magliano is a village in Apulia, on the 'heel' of Italy. It is a frazione of the comune of Carmiano in the province of Lecce and has a population of about 2500.

The village's coat of arms depicts a chain with five links, representing the five founding families of Magliano, and a branch of cherry, a tree once common in the area.

== Geography ==
The village lies about 6 miles southwest of the provincial capital, Lecce.

== History ==
On 8 September 1943, the Kingdom of Italy surrendered to Allied forces, ending its participation in the Second World War (although a breakaway state in the north rejected the surrender). The same day a crust was found with markings depicting Our Lady, which is preserved in the Chapel of 8 September outside the village.

== Festivals and events ==
The patron saint of Magliano is Saint Vitus, who is celebrated on 8 September in the Sagra della Friseddhra N'Capunata. This sees the distribution of Friseddhra, a Salento speciality made from barley bread, olive oil and tomatoes.

The Sagra della Puccia is held on 17 January, a celebration of Saint Anthony the Martyr.
