= Belisario Acquaviva =

Italian nobleman (c. 1464–1528)

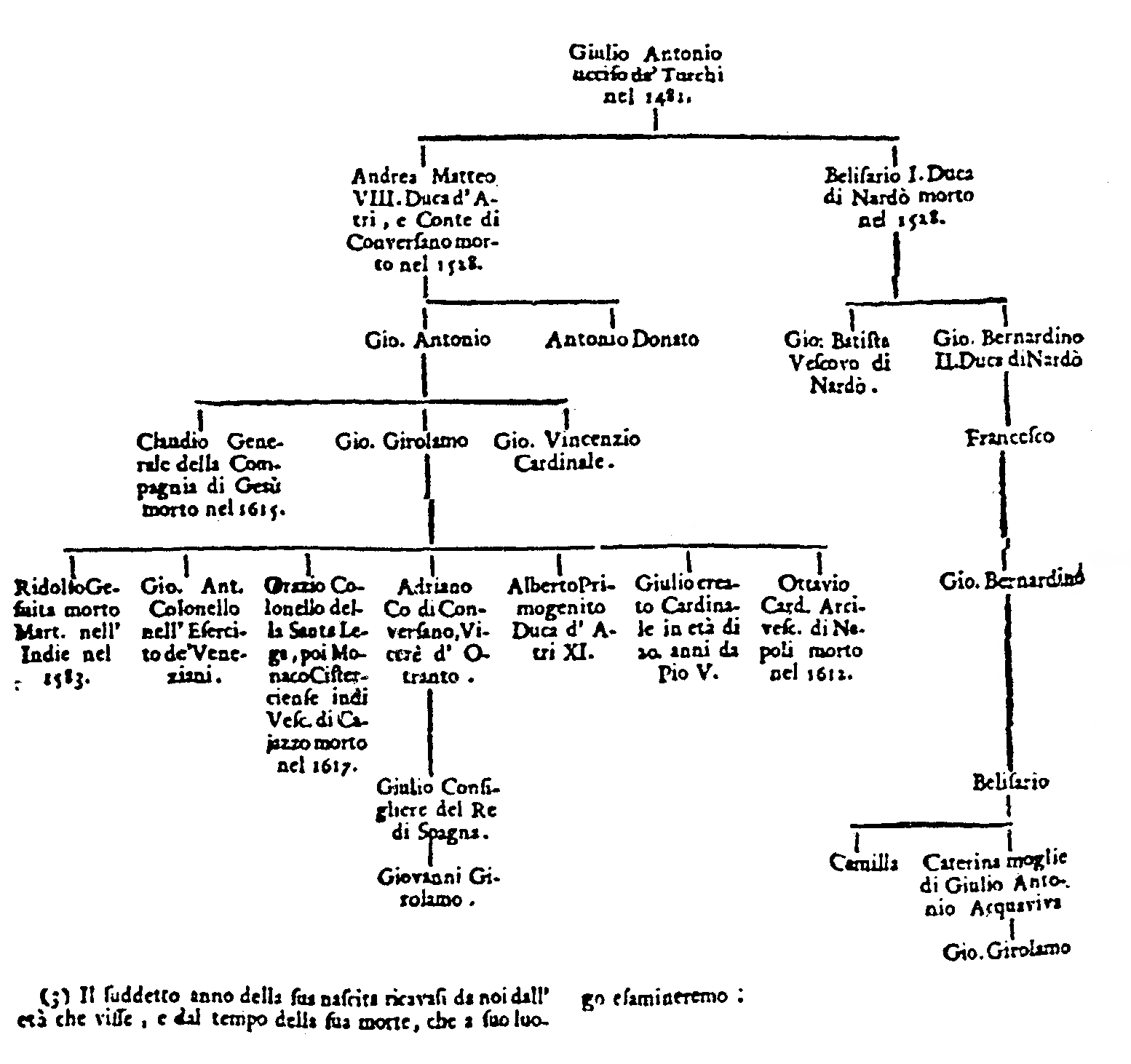
Acquaviva family tree

Belisario Acquaviva, Duca di Nardò (c. 1464 – 24 July 1528) was an Italian nobleman and writer from the Kingdom of Naples.

== Life ==
A younger son of Giulio Antonio Acquaviva and the younger brother of the literary figure Andrea Matteo Acquaviva, Belisario followed the military profession. Unlike his brother Andrea Matteo, 8th Duke of Atri, who supported the French, Belisario fought against Charles VIII of France, and was rewarded by King Ferdinand II of Naples with the fief of Nardò and the title Count. He was later made Duke of Nardò by Charles V. Belisario was hence enabled not only to preserve his patrimony, but to procure the restitution of his brother's.

Like that brother, he applied himself to letters, and left several dissertations, collected since into one volume. He was a friend of Giovanni della Casa, and like his older brother, was a member of the Accademia Pontaniana.

Of this illustrious name were several other members attached to literature. Two dukes of Atri were poets. Both his sons, Giacomo Antonio Acquaviva and Giovanni Battista Acquaviva, served as Bishop of Nardò.

== Issue ==
Belisario Acquaviva married Sveva Sanseverino, daughter of Gerolamo Sanseverino, 2nd Prince of Bisignano, and Vannella Gaetani dell'Aquila d'Aragona. The couple had the following children:

- Andreana († 1568), married to Ferdinand Castriota Scanderbeg, 1st Duke of Galatina
- Antonia, who married Giambattista della Marra, 3rd lord of Montemarano, in 1524
- Giovanni Bernardino († Nardò, 25 August 1541), 2nd Duke of Nardò from 1528, Neapolitan patrician and leader in the service of Emperor Charles V of Habsburg
- Giacomo Antonio.
