= Cortijo Torre de la Reina =

Medieval Almohad fortress and Bien de Interés Cultural in Guillena, Seville, Spain

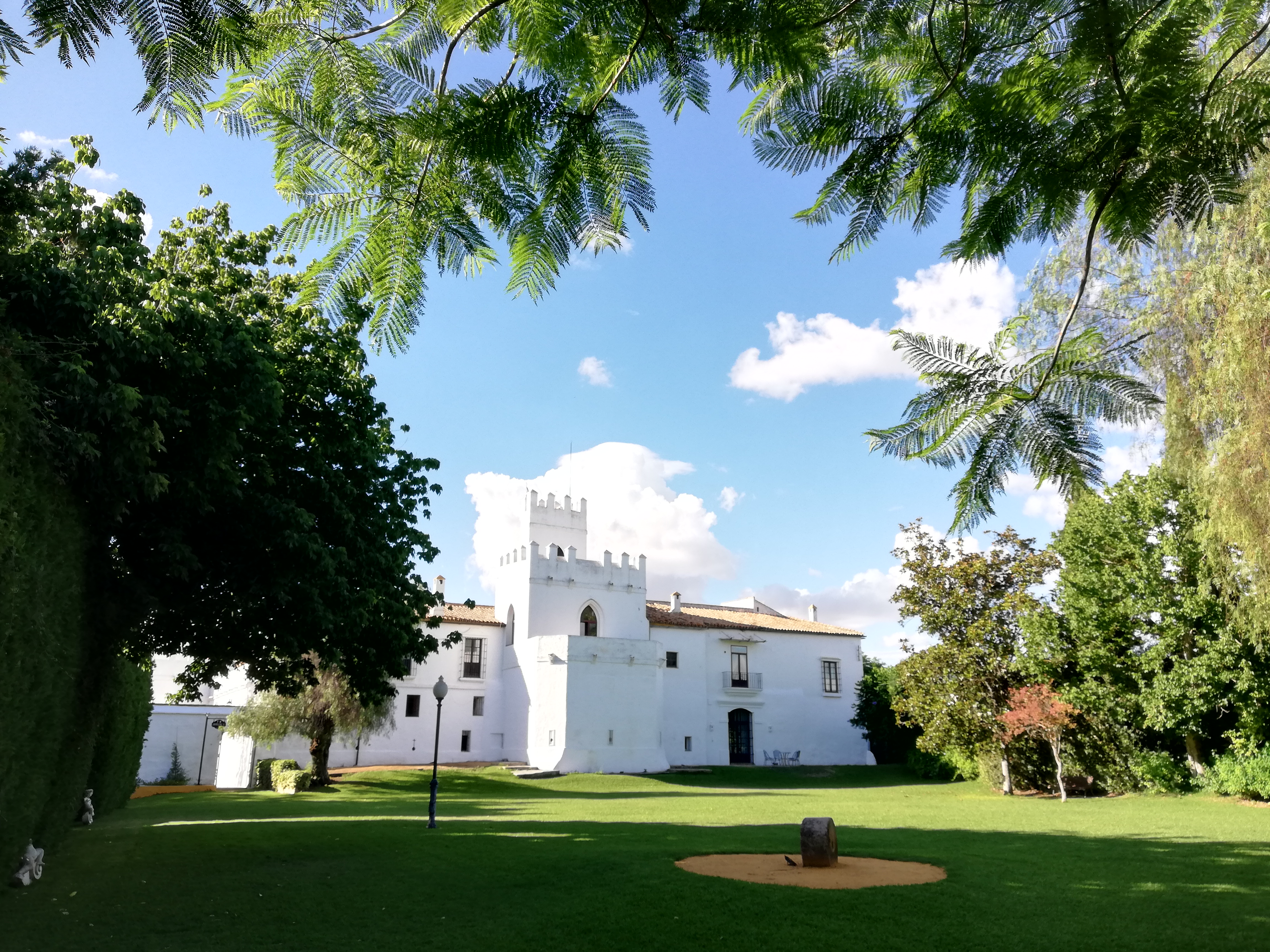
- The southern tower in the Queen's Garden
- Interactive map of the Cortijo Torre de la Reina area

General information
- Type: Medieval fortress, country estate and hotel
- Architectural style: Almohad, Renaissance
- Location: Torre de la Reina, Guillena, Seville, Spain
- Coordinates: 37.5113°N 6.0273°W

Design and construction
- Designations: Bien de Interés Cultural (1977)

The Cortijo Torre de la Reina is a medieval fortified estate located in the hamlet of Torre de la Reina, a district belonging to the municipality of Guillena, in the Province of Seville, Spain. It is the only country estate in Spain of 13th-century origin to have been declared a National Historic-Artistic Monument, a status it received in 1977 under the designation Bien de Interés Cultural. Today the estate operates as a luxury hotel and event venue.

The building takes its name from Maria de Molina, Queen of Castile, who owned it in the late 13th and early 14th centuries. It also gave its name to the surrounding hamlet of Torre de la Reina, which was created as a new settlement in the 1950s by the National Institute of Colonisation and named after the monument.

== History ==
The origin of the building must be understood within the historical context of the Iberian Peninsula during the High Middle Ages, when the peninsula was divided between the Christian kingdoms to the north and the taifa kingdoms to the south. The Taifa of Seville, weakened by pressure from the Christian kingdoms and internal disputes, requested assistance from the Almohads, a Berber tribe from North Africa, who settled in the Kingdom of Seville between 1147 and 1248. On this site, the Almohads built a primitive defensive farmstead to watch for enemy attacks on the city.

On 22 November 1247, the troops of King Ferdinand III of Castile took the site during the Siege of Seville. In the distribution of lands that followed, the estate was granted as a gift to the king's brother, Infante Alfonso of Molina, in recognition of his loyalty and service. After his death, the estate passed to his daughter Maria de Molina, who married King Sancho IV of Castile and became queen consort. Documents record the sale of the estate by the queen, at that time regent for her son Ferdinand IV of Castile, between 1295 and 1312. By the late 14th century the property was in the hands of the House of Ribera.

In the 16th century, with the wars between noble families brought to an end under the Catholic Monarchs, the estate lost its military function and was expanded into a Renaissance-style rural manor house that served as a model for other estates in the Sevillan countryside. The estate later became part of the County of Torre de la Reina in the 17th century. In 1822, during the Liberal Triennium, the widow of the Marquess of Alcanices sold the estate for 400,000 reales to her administrator J.A. Diez Martinez. Following subsequent financial difficulties, it passed in 1849 to the Vazquez family, in whose hands it remained for generations. The estate was owned by the Medina family until 2023, when it was acquired by the Iraheta family, the current owners.

== Description ==
The building has a rectangular floor plan with solid rubble masonry walls in which small arrow slits open, most now blocked, bearing the figure of the orb and cross. The various rooms, in the form of square chambers, are covered by barrel vaults and arranged around a primitive central courtyard, now covered by a barrel vault added in the 16th century and converted into a private chapel. Two square towers were added to the northwest and southeast corners in the 14th century, with their upper sections added in the 16th century. Beneath the entrance there are dungeons and the beginnings of various underground passages which, according to local tradition, would connect the building with the Almohad castle of Guillena and the neighbouring town of Santiponce, though this has not been scientifically confirmed.

=== Private chapel ===
Originally conceived as the courtyard of the fortified house, this rectangular space was covered by a barrel vault added during 16th-century reforms. Its brick walls are decorated with artworks from the Renaissance, Baroque and contemporary periods.

=== Manor courtyard ===
Located on the east side of the fortress, this square courtyard forms part of the residential complex built in the 16th century. On its southern side stands a porticoed gallery of three composite columns in smooth Genoese marble supporting four rounded arches, one of the earliest examples of Renaissance architecture introduced into southern Spain. A staircase in the centre of the gallery leads to the private residential quarters above.

=== Farm courtyard ===
This rectangular courtyard forms part of the residential complex added from the 16th century onwards, and has been extensively remodelled for hotel use. It features a low gallery with basket-handle arches framed by alfices resting on octagonal brick pillars, and contains a well whose medieval stone curb survives below the current ground level.

=== Gardens ===
The estate has several gardens. The intramuros garden, located within the original walled enclosure, consists of two intersecting paths with a small fountain at the centre, surrounded by beds of myrtle hedges with citrus trees. The Queen's Garden is an open lawn area used for events, dominated by the southern medieval tower. The Hispano-Arab Garden, created in the late 20th century and covering over 15,000 square metres, is inspired by the 19th-century Romantic tradition evoking Andalusian Islamic heritage, with water flowing through fountains, irrigation channels and a pool fed by a natural spring.
