= Giulio Antonio Acquaviva =

Italian nobleman (1425–1481)

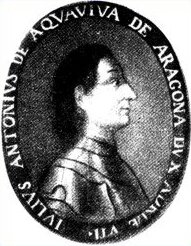
Giulio Antonio Acquaviva.

Giulio Antonio Acquaviva (c. 1425 – 7 February 1481) was an Italian nobleman and condottiere. He was 7th Duke of Atri and 1st of Teramo, Count of Conversano and San Flaviano and Lord of Padula and Roseto.

== Life ==
Giulio Antonio Acquaviva was born at Atri, the son of Giosia Acquaviva, 6th Duke of Atri and Count of San Flaviano, and his wife Antonella Migliorati. He was a member of a patrician family of the Kingdom of Naples with large estates in Abruzzo, and held the titles of Duke of Atri, Count of San Flaviano and Giulianova, Lord of Forcella, Roseto, Padula, and was the first Duke of Teramo. By his marriage with Caterina del Balzo Orsini, his family obtained the title of counts of Conversano, which they retained until the early nineteenth century.

After the battle of San Flaviano (or Battle of Tordino) between Francesco Sforza and Niccolò Piccinino on 25 July 1460, San Flaviano was sacked by Matteo di Capua's soldiers the following year and reduced to rubble. Instead of restoring the city, in 1471 Giulio Antonio Acquaviva preferred to build a new one higher up near the ancient city: Giulianova. It was an interesting example of a Renaissance ideal city, applying the theory of the most important architects of the time, as Leon Battista Alberti and Francesco Di Giorgio Martini.

In 1478, he commanded the fleet that supported the Neapolitan army of King Ferrante of Aragon, which had joined the coalition formed by Pope Sixtus IV against the Republic of Florence. For having guided and advised the Duke of Calabria, son of the King, he was awarded the Order of the Ermine. Moreover, with the privilege of the King of Naples on April 30, 1479, he received the honour of being able to add the name of Aragon to his surname and to add to the family coat of arms the insignia of the royal house. In 1479, he obtained from the Neapolitan king the surname "Acquaviva of Aragon".

In 1480 he went to Apulia to fight the Turks, who had taken Otranto and threatened Brindisi. During the campaign for the reconquest of Otranto in 1481, he lost his life in an ambush at Serrano. His body was beheaded, and his head was taken by the Turks and sent to Constantinople to the Sultan as a war trophy and never returned for any ransom. The body is buried, together with his wife, in the church of Santa Maria dell'Isola in Conversano, in a funeral monument by the Apulian sculptor Nuzzo Barba.

Giulio Antonio died at Minervino di Lecce, and was succeeded in Conversano by his son Andrea Matteo. Another son was Belisario Acquaviva. His latter day descendants include: Giulio Antonio Acquaviva (c 1808- 1836), Naples Italy, Príncipe Giuseppe Colonna Acquaviva (c 1835-1905), Naples Campania, Italy; Maria Acquaviva (c 1855- 1905) Naples, and Anna Maria Acquaviva di Lorenzo (c 1883- 1956), Naples Campania, Italy.

== Family ==
Giulio Antonio Acquaviva married Caterina Orsini del Balzo in 1456, the natural daughter of the Prince of Taranto Giovanni Antonio Del Balzo Orsini, Countess of Conversano and Lady of Bitetto, Casamassima, Castellana, Gioia del Colle, Noci and Turi. They had four children:

- Giovanni Antonio (1457-1479), Marquis of Bitonto, died during his stay in Pisa;
- Andrea Matteo (1458-1529), married for the first time Isabella Todeschini Piccolomini d'Aragona, daughter of Antonio, 1st Duke of Amalfi and Count of Celano, and remained a widower in his second marriage in 1509 Caterina Della Ratta. Duke of Atri (from 1481) and Count of Conversano and Giulia, he was one of the richest and most powerful feudal lords of the Kingdom of Naples. From 1509, the Acquaviva family succeeded the Della Ratta family as counts (later princes) of Caserta, who had maintained this title since 1310.
- Donato, bishop of Conversano from 1499 to 1528;
- Belisario (1464-1528), 1st Duke of Nardò (from 12 March 1497) and 14th Count of Conversano. He was a leader in the service of the King of the Kingdom of Naples and of the Emperor Charles V. He married Sveva Sanseverino of the princes of Bisignano; his daughter, Andreana, was duchess of Galatina and married Ferdinand Castriota Scanderbeg (descendant of the Albanian leader Giorgio Castriota Scanderbeg).

Giulio Antonio Acquaviva then remarried to Maria Spinelli.

His illegitimate son, Sulpicio, became Bishop of Conversano from 1483 until his death in 1494;
