= Veglie =

Veglie Greek: Elos
- Comune
- Comune di Veglie
- Coat of arms

- Location within Italy Location within Apulia
- Coordinates: 40°20′N 17°58′E
- Country: Italy
- Region: Apulia
- Province: Lecce (LE)
- Frazioni: Campi Salentina, Carmiano, Leverano, Nardò, Novoli, Salice Salentino

Government
  - Mayor: Claudio Paladini

Area
  - Total: 61.35 km^{2} (23.69 sq mi)
- Elevation: 47 m (154 ft)

Population (31 December 2017)
  - Total: 13,947
  - Density: 227.3/km^{2} (588.8/sq mi)
- Demonym: Vegliesi
- Time zone: UTC+1 (CET)
  - Summer (DST): UTC+2 (CEST)
- Postal code: 73010
- Dialing code: 0832
- ISTAT code: 075092
- Patron saint: St. John the Baptist
- Saint day: 24 June
- Website: Official website

Velhe (Salentino: Eje) is a town and comune in the Italian province of Lecce in the Apulia region of south-east Italy. Veglie is 20 kilometres (12 mi) west of Lecce and 12 kilometres (7 mi) east of the sea, the Gulf of Taranto. It is bounded by the comuni of Campi Salentina, Carmiano, Leverano, Nardò, Novoli and Salice Salentino.

== History ==
Veglie was founded around the 10th century.

Francesco Ribezzo thinks that the name Veglie comes from pre-Messapic vel, of Mediterranean origin, meaning "elevation".

A tomb found in Via Novoli in 1957 dates back to Messapic times. It is displayed in a provincial museum.

== Economy ==
Its main industries are agriculture, which features olive and wine production and manufacturers. Ice cream is also produced in the village.
