= Carmiano =

- Comune
- Comune di Carmiano
- Location within Italy Location within Apulia
- Coordinates: 40°20′45″N 18°2′45″E
- Country: Italy
- Region: Apulia
- Province: Lecce (LE)
- Frazioni: Magliano

Government
  - Mayor: Giovanni Erroi (La Matita - PartecipiAmo (Civic List))

Area
  - Total: 23 km^{2} (8.9 sq mi)
- Elevation: 33 m (108 ft)

Population (13 March 2017)
  - Total: 12,146
  - Density: 530/km^{2} (1,400/sq mi)
- Demonym: Carmianoti
- Time zone: UTC+1 (CET)
  - Summer (DST): UTC+2 (CEST)
- Postal code: 73041
- Dialing code: 0832
- ISTAT code: 075014
- Patron saint: Madonna Nostra and St. Vitus
- Saint day: 17 August
- Website: Official website

Carmiano (Salentino: Carmianu) is a town and comune in the province of Lecce in the Apulia region of south-east Italy. Carmiano is in the heart of the province of Lecce and Salento. It is located 20 kilometres (12 mi) east of the Ionian Sea (Porto Cesareo) and 16 kilometres (10 mi) west of the Adriatic Sea (San Cataldo).

== Geography ==
The commune is located in the area called the Valle della Cupa or the Cupa Valley and is situated northwest of the Salentino cape. The terrain is mainly flat and features olive crops as well as fruits and vegetables along with cattle and others.

Bounding communes are Arnesano, Novoli and Veglie.

== History ==
The origin of the communal name probably comes from the colour "carminium" (red). Another possibility is that it came from a name of the Roman Centurion "Carminius" who was assigned to the Roman Senate; the land at the time was in the area of Salento.
