= Guillena =

- city
- Flag Coat of arms
- Interactive map of Guillena
- Coordinates: 37°32′N 6°03′W
- Country: Spain
- Province: Seville
- Municipality: Guillena

Area
  - Total: 226 km^{2} (87 sq mi)
- Elevation: 28 m (92 ft)

Population (2025-01-01)
  - Total: 14,260
  - Density: 63.1/km^{2} (163/sq mi)
- Time zone: UTC+1 (CET)
  - Summer (DST): UTC+2 (CEST)

Guillena is a city located in the province of Seville, Spain. According to the 2005 census (INE), the city has a population of 9,035 inhabitants.

== Nature ==
Guillena has a zoo with white lions, among other animals.

== See also ==
- List of municipalities in Seville
- Cortijo Torre de la Reina
