= Vespasiano Colonna =

Italian nobleman and condottiero (d. 1528)

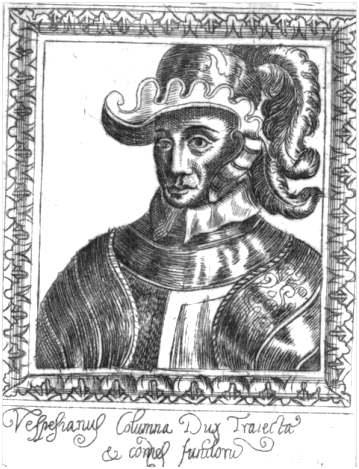
Vespasiano Colonna

Vespasiano Colonna (c. 1485 – 13 March 1528) was an Italian nobleman and condottiero, a member of the Colonna family.

== Biography ==
He was the son of Prospero Colonna, duke of Traetto (modern Minturno) and count of Fondi, and Covella di Sanseverino. Like his father, he fought for the imperial side in the Italian Wars; in 1524, in reward, he obtained by Charles V the county of Belgioioso, confiscated from the Barbiano family. Sent to defend the Spanish-controlled Kingdom of Naples, he fought the French army of John Stewart, Duke of Albany. He later participated in the battle of Pavia, where King Francis I of France was captured.

In 1526, Colonna was later required by Pope Clement V to serve as a mediator with Francis I, but the increasing tension between the Pope and the Colonna family caused relationships to break. After the Colonna had occupied Anagni, the Pope proposed to pardon him in exchange of stopping fighting against the papal lands: Colonna replied assaulting the papal palace in the Vatican City, forcing the pope to take shelter in Castel Sant'Angelo. Vespasiano and all his parents were therefore excommunicated. The following year, they participated in the sack of Rome. He was later reconciled with the pope thanks to the intercession of Imperial ministers.

He died at Paliano in 1528.

== Family ==
Colonna first married Beatrice Appiani of Piombino, with whom he had a daughter, Isabella Colonna. In 1526 he remarried to Giulia Gonzaga, daughter of Ludovico Gonzaga duke of Sabbioneta.

== Sources ==
- Litta, Pompeo (1835). Famiglie celebri d'Italia. Turin: Colonna di Roma.
- Franca Petrucci: Dizionario Biografico degli Italiani, vol. XXVII (1982).
- Società Genealogica Italiana: Libro d´oro della nobiltà mediterranea, (2014).
