= Giacomo Antonio Acquaviva =

Most Reverend Giacomo Antonio Acquaviva
- Bishop of Nardò
- Church: Catholic Church
- Diocese: Diocese of Nardò
- In office: 1521-1532
- Predecessor: Marco Cornaro
- Successor: Giovanni Domenico de Cupis
- Previous post: Bishop of Avellino e Frigento (1505–1507)

Personal details
- Died: Naples, Italy

Giacomo Antonio Acquaviva (1490 ? - 1568) was a Roman Catholic prelate who served as Bishop of Nardò (1521–1532). He was the son of the Marchese di Nardò, and only seventeen when appointed.

== Biography ==
Giacomo Antonio Acquaviva was the son of Italian nobleman Belisario Acquaviva, the Marchese di Nardò. The church of Nardò remained uninterruptedly under the jurisdiction of the Acquaviva family, then Lords of the City. Giacomo Antonio Acquaviva was only 17 years old when appointed Bishop of Nardò by Pope Leo X on 20 February 1521. Although he served as "bishop-elect", he was never officially installed nor consecrated. The story was that, although a pious man, he had an affair early in his bishopric and the church allowed him to continue in his position due to the influence of his father but refused to consecrate him.

He served as Bishop of Nardò until his resignation in 1532 at the insistence of his father after his affair was publicly revealed. He fled to Naples with his lover, where they were married. After the marriage he settled in Naples where he lived until the rest of his life in the midst of high society and the aristocracy of his time. He was always correct, loved and practiced religion and works of charity deeply, especially the help to the poor. He died on December 31, 1568.

His brother, Giovanni Battista Acquaviva, was appointed as Bishop of Nardò 4 years later.

== See also ==
- Catholic Church in Italy

== Sources ==
- Eubel, Conradus, ed. (1913). Hierarchia catholica (in Latin). Vol. 1 (second ed.). Münster: Libreria Regensbergiana.

== External links and additional sources ==
- Cheney, David M. "Diocese of Nardò-Gallipoli". Catholic-Hierarchy.org. (for Chronology of Bishops) ^{[self-published]}
- Chow, Gabriel. "Diocese of Nardò-Gallipoli (Italy)". GCatholic.org.(for Chronology of Bishops) ^{[self-published]}

Catholic Church titles
Preceded by Gabriele Setario	Bishop of Nardò; 1521–1532	Succeeded by Giovanni Domenico de Cupis
