= Ripattoni =

Coordinates: 42°42′52″N 13°49′57″E

- Frazione
- Interactive map of Ripattoni
- Country: Italy
- Region: Abruzzo
- Province: Teramo
- Time zone: UTC+1 (CET)
  - Summer (DST): UTC+2 (CEST)

Ripattoni is a frazione in the Province of Teramo in the Abruzzo region of Italy.
