= Cenate =

- Frazione
- Location of Cenate in Italy
- Coordinates: 40°11′5″N 18°3′0″E
- Country: Italy
- Region: Apulia
- Province: Lecce (LE)
- Comune: Nardò
- Elevation: 40 m (130 ft)
- Demonym: Cenatesi
- Time zone: UTC+1 (CET)
  - Summer (DST): UTC+2 (CEST)
- Postal code: 73048
- Dialing code: (+39) 0833

Cenate is a village in Apulia, southern Italy, a frazione of the municipality of Nardò.

== Main sights ==
It is known for its noble villas (c. twenty in number) built from the 15th to the early 20th centuries. The most notable are the Villa del Vescovo, the summer residence of the Bishop of Nardò and the Villa Taverna, the most ancient one.

== See also ==
- Santa Maria al Bagno
