= Mingoval =

- Commune
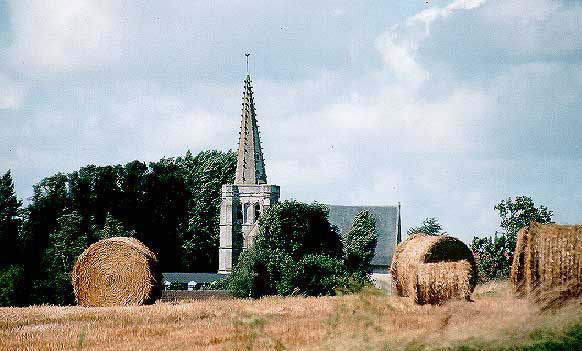
- The church of Mingoval

- Coat of arms
- Location of Mingoval
- Location within France Location within Hauts-de-France
- Coordinates: 50°22′31″N 2°34′32″E
- Country: France
- Region: Hauts-de-France
- Department: Pas-de-Calais
- Arrondissement: Arras
- Canton: Avesnes-le-Comte
- Intercommunality: CC Campagnes de l'Artois

Government
  - Mayor (2020–2026): Sidonie Duriez
- Area^{1}: 3.79 km^{2} (1.46 sq mi)
- Elevation: 125 m (410 ft)
- Highest elevation: 157 m (515 ft)
- Lowest elevation: 109 m (358 ft)
- Population (2023): 228
  - Density: 60.2/km^{2} (156/sq mi)
- Time zone: UTC+01:00 (CET)
  - Summer (DST): UTC+02:00 (CEST)
- INSEE/Postal code: 62574 /62690
- ^{1} French Land Register data, which excludes lakes, ponds, glaciers > 1 km^{2} (0.386 sq mi or 247 acres) and river estuaries.

Mingoval (French pronunciation: [mɛ̃ɡɔval]) is a commune in the Pas-de-Calais department in the Hauts-de-France region of France 12 miles (19 km) northwest of Arras.

== Population ==
Historical population
Year	Pop.	±% p.a.
1968	201	—
1975	196	−0.36%
1982	183	−0.98%
1990	207	+1.55%
1999	208	+0.05%
2007	202	−0.37%
2012	221	+1.81%
2017	230	+0.80%
2023	228	−0.15%
Source: INSEE

== See also ==
- Communes of the Pas-de-Calais department
