= Bellante, Abruzzo =

Bellante
- Comune
- Comune di Bellante
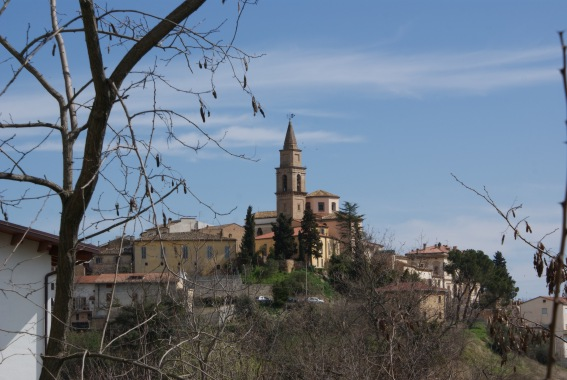

- Location within Italy Location within Abruzzo
- Coordinates: 42°45′N 13°48′E
- Country: Italy
- Region: Abruzzo
- Province: Teramo (TE)
- Frazioni: Bellante Stazione, Chiareto di Bellante, Collerenti, Molino San Nicola, Penna alta, Penna bassa, Ripattoni (o Ripattone), San Mauro, Sant'Angelo a Marano, Sant'Arcangelo, Villa Ardente, Villa Casalena, Villa Rasicci

Government
  - Mayor: Giovanni Melchiorre (PD)

Area
  - Total: 50.04 km^{2} (19.32 sq mi)
- Elevation: 354 m (1,161 ft)

Population (31 May 2022)
  - Total: 6,848
  - Density: 136.9/km^{2} (354.4/sq mi)
- Demonym: Bellantesi
- Time zone: UTC+1 (CET)
  - Summer (DST): UTC+2 (CEST)
- Postal code: 64020
- Dialing code: 0861
- Patron saint: Athanasius of Alexandria
- Saint day: 2 May
- Website: Official website

Bellante (Abruzzese: Bëllindë) is a town and comune in the province of Teramo, in the Abruzzo region of eastern Italy.

== Climate ==
Climate data for Bellante, elevation 354 m (1,161 ft), (1951–2000)
Month	Jan	Feb	Mar	Apr	May	Jun	Jul	Aug	Sep	Oct	Nov	Dec	Year
Record high °C (°F)	19.0 (66.2)	20.5 (68.9)	23.0 (73.4)	23.5 (74.3)	29.0 (84.2)	33.7 (92.7)	37.0 (98.6)	40.0 (104.0)	35.0 (95.0)	30.0 (86.0)	24.0 (75.2)	20.0 (68.0)	40.0 (104.0)
Mean daily maximum °C (°F)	8.7 (47.7)	9.5 (49.1)	12.0 (53.6)	14.7 (58.5)	19.5 (67.1)	24.2 (75.6)	27.8 (82.0)	28.1 (82.6)	23.4 (74.1)	18.7 (65.7)	13.0 (55.4)	9.3 (48.7)	17.4 (63.3)
Daily mean °C (°F)	6.4 (43.5)	6.9 (44.4)	9.0 (48.2)	11.6 (52.9)	16.2 (61.2)	20.6 (69.1)	23.9 (75.0)	24.2 (75.6)	19.9 (67.8)	15.8 (60.4)	10.6 (51.1)	7.2 (45.0)	14.4 (57.9)
Mean daily minimum °C (°F)	4.2 (39.6)	4.4 (39.9)	6.1 (43.0)	8.5 (47.3)	13.0 (55.4)	17.0 (62.6)	20.1 (68.2)	20.4 (68.7)	16.4 (61.5)	12.9 (55.2)	8.2 (46.8)	5.0 (41.0)	11.4 (52.4)
Record low °C (°F)	−5.5 (22.1)	−6.0 (21.2)	−4.0 (24.8)	1.0 (33.8)	2.5 (36.5)	10.0 (50.0)	12.0 (53.6)	8.0 (46.4)	7.0 (44.6)	3.0 (37.4)	−2.0 (28.4)	−5.9 (21.4)	−6.0 (21.2)
Average precipitation mm (inches)	52.3 (2.06)	42.5 (1.67)	53.6 (2.11)	59.6 (2.35)	48.8 (1.92)	51.7 (2.04)	42.1 (1.66)	49.7 (1.96)	63.0 (2.48)	78.0 (3.07)	73.9 (2.91)	73.1 (2.88)	688.3 (27.11)
Average precipitation days	5.8	6.1	7.0	7.3	6.4	6.2	4.8	5.1	6.3	6.9	7.6	8.1	77.6
Source: Regione Abruzzo (precipitation 1951–2009)
