= Order of the Ermine (Naples) =

Chivalric order

The Order of the Ermine (L’Ordre de l’Hermine) was a chivalric order created in 1464 by king Ferdinand I of Naples. The motto was "Malo mori quam foedari" ("I would rather die than be dishonored").

== Recipients ==
- Federico da Montefeltro, Duke of Urbino
- Charles the Bold, Duke of Burgundy
- Giulio Antonio Acquaviva, 1478
- Ludovico Sforza, Duke of Milan, since 1488

== Sources ==
- Gustav Adolph Ackermann, Ordensbuch, Sämtlicher in Europa blühender und erloschener Orden und Ehrenzeichen. Annaberg, 1855, p 254 n° 149. "Orden vom Hermelin"
