= Conversano =

- Comune
- Comune di Conversano
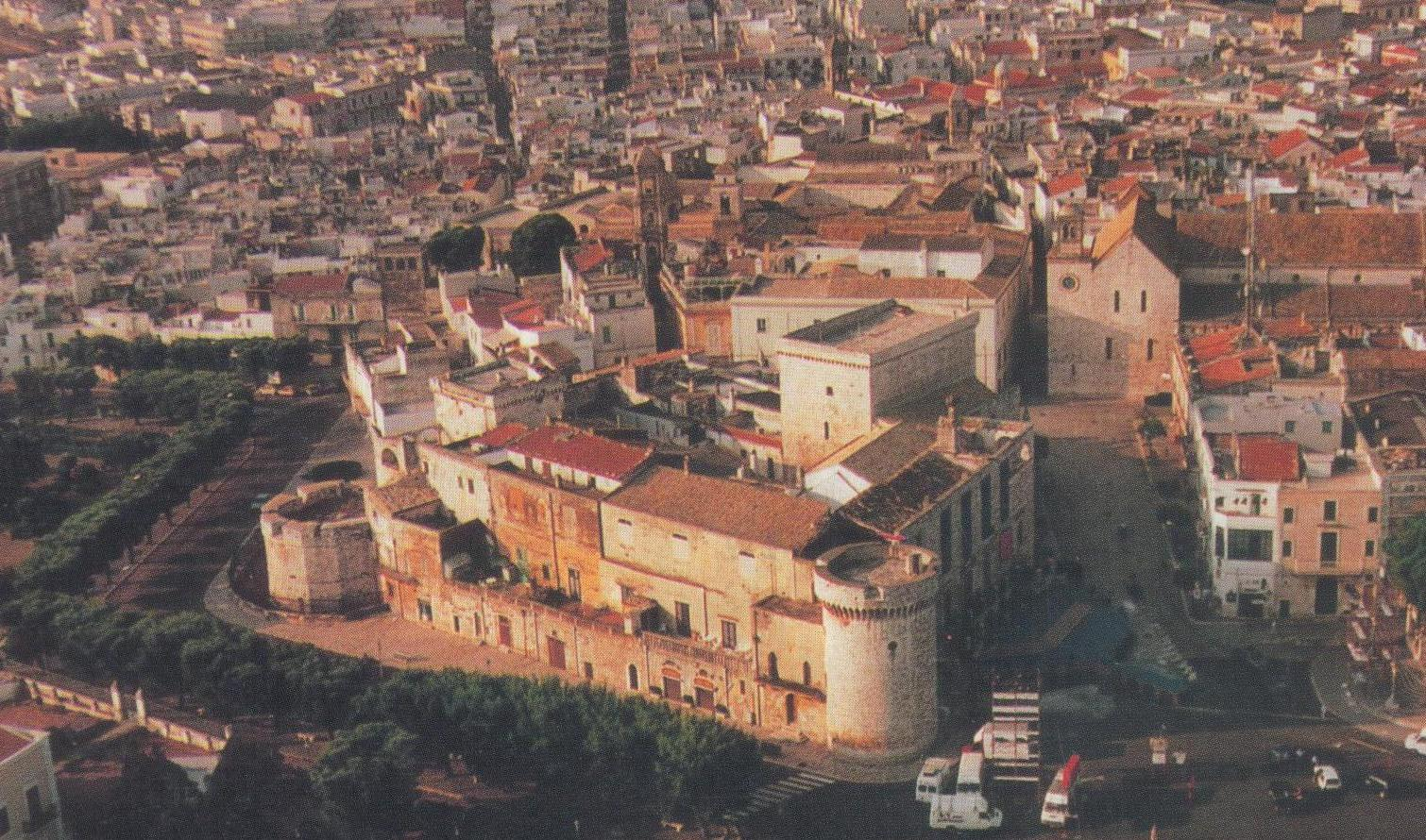
- View of Conversano

- Coat of arms

- Location within Italy Location within Apulia
- Coordinates: 40°58′N 17°07′E
- Country: Italy
- Region: Apulia
- Metropolitan city: Bari (BA)
- Frazioni: Castiglione, Triggianello

Government
  - Mayor: Pasquale Loiacono

Area
  - Total: 128.42 km^{2} (49.58 sq mi)
- Elevation: 219 m (719 ft)

Population (31 December 2017)
  - Total: 26,171
  - Density: 203.79/km^{2} (527.82/sq mi)
- Demonym: Conversanesi
- Time zone: UTC+1 (CET)
  - Summer (DST): UTC+2 (CEST)
- Postal code: 70014
- Dialing code: 080
- Patron saint: Saint Flavian
- Saint day: November 24
- Website: Official website

Conversano (Barese: Cunverséne) is an ancient town and comune in the Metropolitan City of Bari, Apulia, south-eastern Italy. It is 30 kilometres (19 mi) southeast of Bari and 7 kilometres (4 mi) from the Adriatic coast, at 219 metres (719 ft) above sea level.

The counts of Conversano owned a stud that they used to breed black Neapolitan stallions with Barb and Andalusian genetic backgrounds: these horses had strong ram-like heads, short backs, and broad hocks. One horse born in 1767, Conversano, became one of the principal stallions for establishing the Lipizzan horses (Lipizzaner).

== History ==
The town of Conversano was settled as early as the Iron Age, when the Iapygians or the Peucetians founded Norba. Later, as evidenced by the 6th-century BC necropolis, it became a flourishing trade town that was influenced by the nearby Greek colonies. Norba was conquered by the Romans in 268 BC and seems to have been abandoned around the time of the Visigothic invasion of Italy in 410–411.

The toponym, Casale Cupersanem, is known from the 5th century AD and was a bishopric seat from the 7th century. This new town gained importance when, in 1054, the Norman lord Geoffrey, assumed the title of "Count of Conversano" and turned Conversano into the capital of a large county that extended to Lecce and Nardò. After the count's death in 1101, the county was inherited by his sons Robert and Alexander. In 1132, defeated by Roger II of Sicily, Alexander fled to Dalmatia, and the county was assigned to Robert I of Basseville, who was succeeded by his son Robert II. After a period of royal sovereignty, Conversano was a possession of Bernardino Gentile and of the Brienne, the Enghien, Luxembourg, Sanseverino, Barbiano, Orsini, Caldora and Orsini del Balzo families. In 1455, Giovanni Antonio del Balzo Orsini died; the county was inherited by his daughter Catherine, whose husband, Giulio Antonio Acquaviva, started the long rule of the Acquaviva family, which lasted until the early 19th century.

In 1690 the town was struck by plague and decimated. Feudalism was abolished in 1806.

In 1921, a local socialist deputy, Giuseppe Di Vagno, was assassinated in Mola di Bari by Fascist militia.

=== Counts of Conversano ===
This list may not be complete.

Year(s)	Name	Notes
1072–1100	Geoffrey, Count of Conversano	first Count of Conversano
1100–1132	Alexander, Count of Conversano	son of Geoffrey; deprived of his territories in 1132 by King Roger II of Sicily; died after 1142
1132–1138	Robert I of Basseville	brother-in-law of Roger II of Sicily
1138–1182	Robert II of Basseville	son of Robert I; also Count of Loritello as Robert III
1182–1187	Adelise of Loritello	wife of previous; also Countess of Loritello

== Main sights ==
Conversano's main attraction is the medieval Castle, which dates from the period of Norman-Hohenstaufen rule in the Kingdom of Sicily. The castle is located on a hill overlooking the city, and probably dates from the Gothic Wars (6th century), although it was rebuilt from the 11th century. It has a single round tower that was added by Giulio Antonio Acquaviva.

The Romanesque cathedral is the see of the diocese of Conversano-Monopoli. It was built in the 11th century but received new decor in the 14th and, in Baroque style, in the 17th centuries. The exterior is in Romanesque style with a large 15th-century rose window and three portals, the middle one having sculpted decoration. The floor plan is T-shaped with two eastbound apses; the aisles are characterized by matronea and, in the left one, a 15th-century fresco from the Pisan school. The church houses the icon of the Madonna della Fonte, protector of the city.

The Benedictine Monastery, founded, according to tradition, in the 6th century, was once one of the most powerful in Apulia. In 1266, the Benedictines were replaced by a group of Cistercian nuns from Greece. It was the only convent in western Europe that allowed nuns to wear male religious symbols, such as the mitre. The church has maintained part of the 11th-century structure, while the decorated side entrance is from 1658. The interior has a nave and two aisles, with Baroque decor, and two canvasses by Paolo Finoglio. The crypt, dedicated to San Mauro, is from the 11th century. The bell tower rises higher than that of the cathedral, to symbolize the superior status of the nuns over the local bishop.

Other landmarks include the megalithic walls (6th century BC) erected by the Pelasgi, the Baroque church of SS. Cosma e Damiano, the church of St. Francis (1289), and, 1 km outside the city, the church of St. Catherine (c. 12th century). In the neighborhood are the church of Santa Maria dell'Isola (1462, enlarged in 1530), the Castle of Marchione (an 18th-century country residence of the Acquaviva), and the ruins of Castiglione (13th-16th centuries).

== Sport ==
The local handball team won the national league in the 2002–03 2003–04 2005–06 2009–10 seasons.

== Notable people ==
People who were born in, residents of, or otherwise closely associated with Conversano include:

- Andrea Matteo Acquaviva, (1458–1529), nobleman and condottiero from the Kingdom of Naples
- Francesco Carelli, (1758-1832), administrative officer of the Kingdom of Naples and antiquarian
- Paolo Domenico Finoglia, (c. 1590–1645), painter of the early-Baroque period
- Giuseppe Laterza, (born 1970), prelate of the Catholic Church
- Domenico Morea, (1833-1902), priest, educator and historian

== Twin towns ==
- Cascia, Italy, since 1998
- Nardò, Italy, since 2008
- Fratta Polesine, Italy, since 2008
- Trecenta, Italy, since 2008
- Recanati, Italy, since 2008
- Bethlehem, Palestinian Authority, since 13 August 2009
