= Nardò =

Nardò Neríton (Greek)
- Comune
- Comune di Nardò
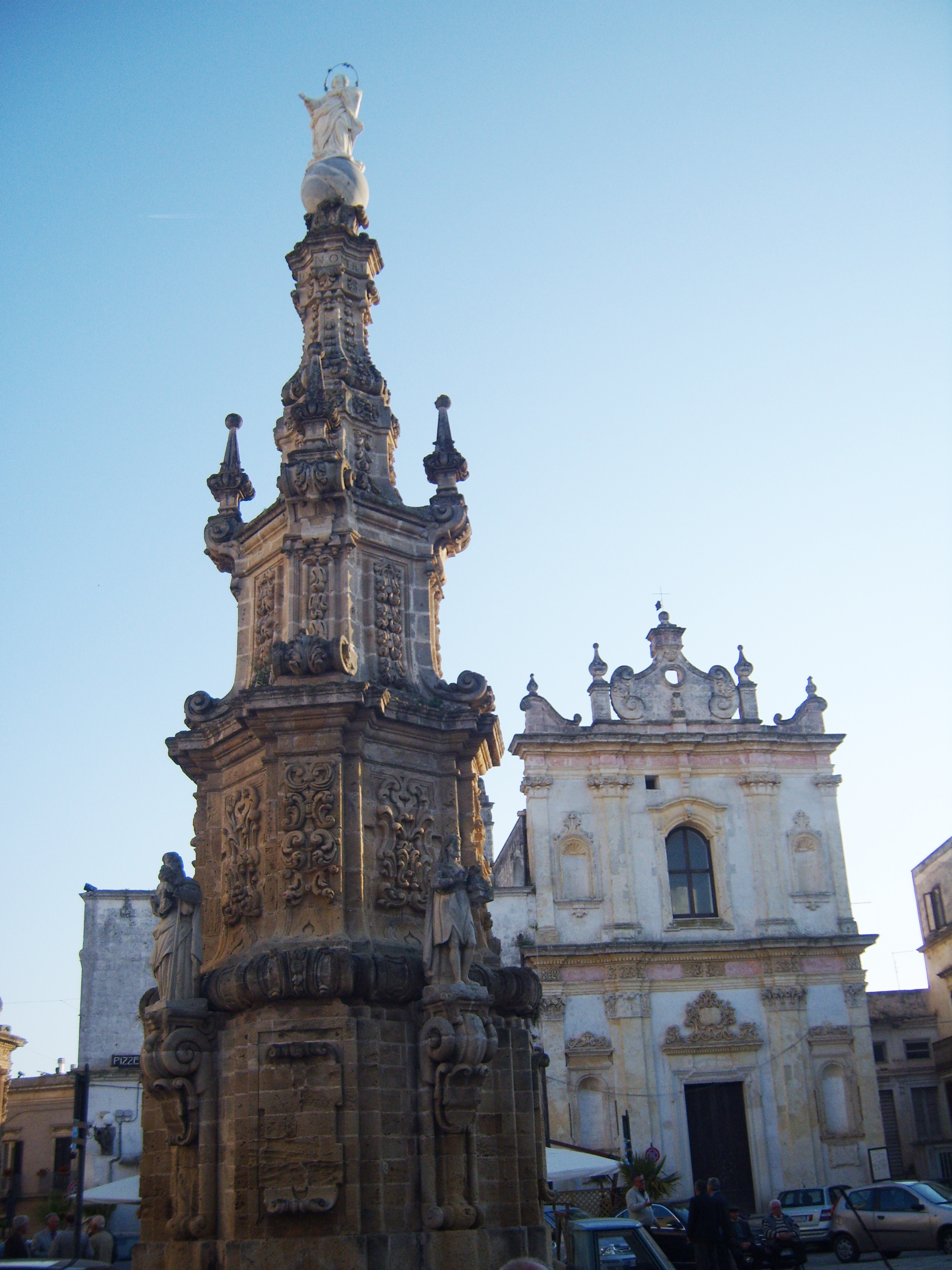
- 18th century column in Piazza Salandra

- Coat of arms

- Nardò within the Province of Lecce

- Location of Nardò in Italy Nardò (Apulia)
- Coordinates: 40°10′47″N 18°02′00″E
- Country: Italy
- Region: Apulia
- Province: Lecce (LE)
- Frazioni: Boncore, Cenate(li megghiu), Pagani, Palude del Capitano, Portoselvaggio, Roccacannuccia, Santa Caterina, Sant'Isidoro, Santa Maria al Bagno, Torre Inserraglio, Torre Uluzzo, Villaggio Resta

Government
  - Mayor: Giuseppe Mellone

Area
  - Total: 190.48 km^{2} (73.54 sq mi)
- Elevation: 45 m (148 ft)

Population (30 November 2017)
  - Total: 31,442
  - Density: 165.07/km^{2} (427.52/sq mi)
- Demonym: Neretini
- Time zone: UTC+1 (CET)
  - Summer (DST): UTC+2 (CEST)
- Postal code: 73048
- Dialing code: 0833
- ISTAT code: 075052
- Patron saint: St. Gregory the Illuminator
- Saint day: February 20
- Website: Official website

Nardò (Latin: Neritum or Neretum; Messapic: Nareton) is a town and comune in the southern Italian region of Apulia, in the Province of Lecce.

Lies on a lowland area placed at south-west of its Province, its border includes part of the Ionian coast of Salento.

For centuries, it had been one of the central cities of the Byzantine Empire. In 1497 the ducal House of Acquaviva acquired it under their domain. During those years it became the main cultural hotspot of Salento, seat of many universities, academies, literary and philosophical studies. It was given the name of Nuoua Atene litterarum.

With almost 32,000 inhabitants and 190 squared kilometres of land, it is the second largest and most populated city among those in the Province, right after Lecce, and also one of the most culturally active towns of Salento. The Old Town is particularly rich with palaces, churches, chapels and other architectural details shaped accordingly to the principles of Lecce's Baroque style. Indeed, the city is a significant example of this art movement along with Gallipoli and Lecce.

The stretch of coast wet by the Ionian Sea is split into small inhabited fractions such as Santa Caterina, Santa Maria al Bagno, Sant'Isidoro and Porto Selvaggio. The latter is a Nature Reserve created by a reforestation that happened during 1950s.

== Geography ==
Part of Salento, Nardò is located in the north-western area of the province, by the Ionian Sea. The municipality borders with Avetrana (TA), Copertino, Galatina, Galatone, Leverano, Porto Cesareo, Salice Salentino and Veglie.

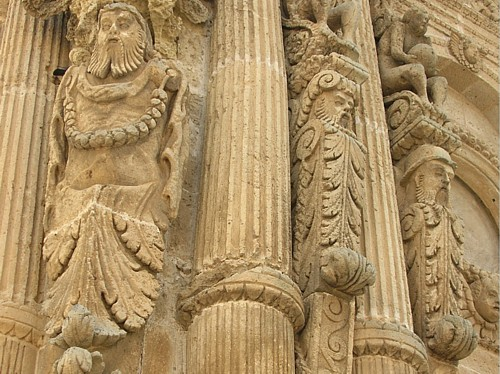
Details of the façade of the church of San Domenico.

== History ==
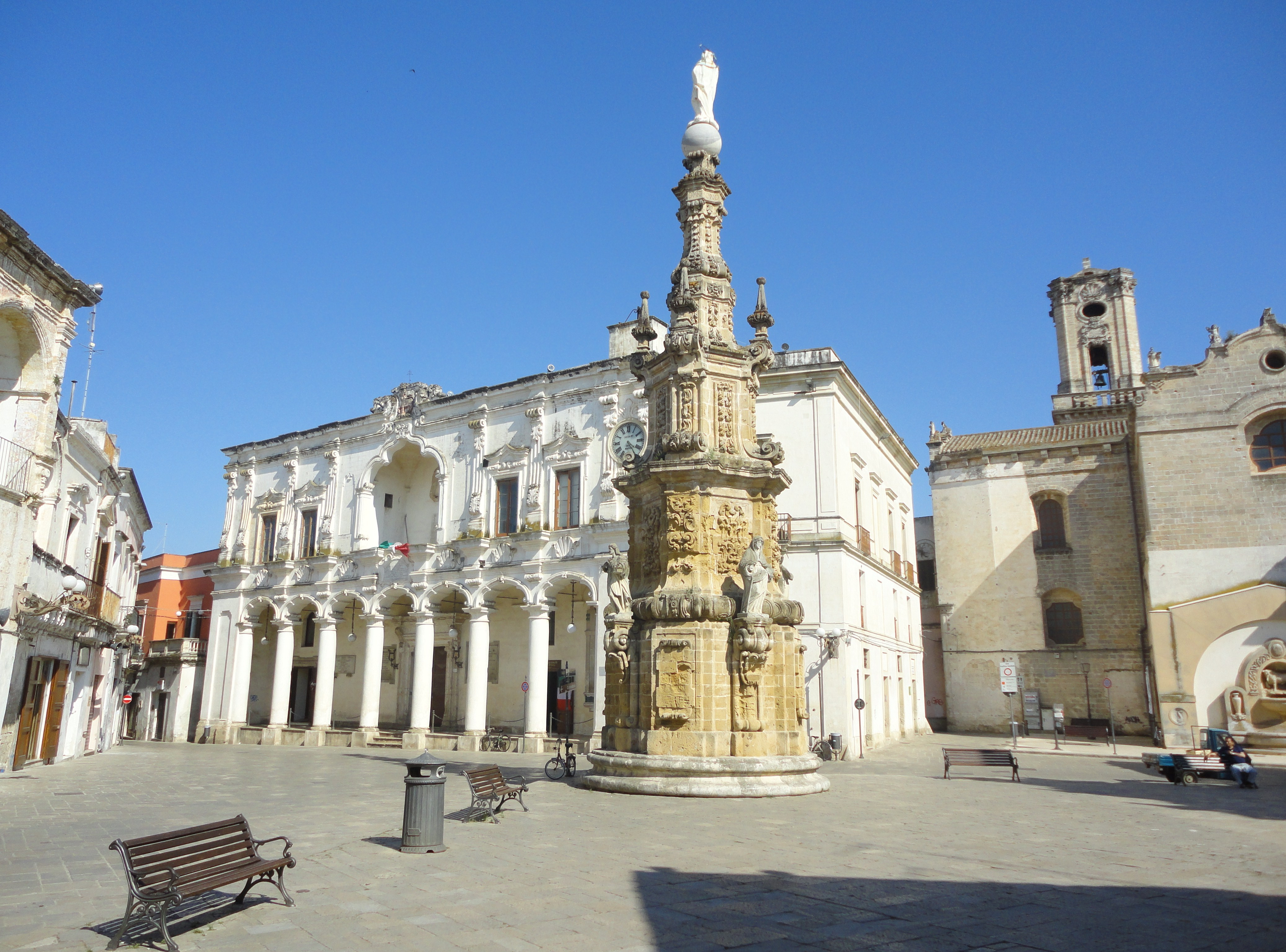
Piazza Salandra.

Traces of human presence in the area dates from Palaeolithic times. The settlement was founded by the Messapi around the year 1000 BC. The Romans conquered it in 269 BC and built the Via Traiana through it. After the fall of the Western Empire it was under the Byzantines and the Lombards.

In 1055 the Normans captured Nardò. Their heirs were ousted by the Angevines in 1266. In 1497 the Aragonese gave it to Andrea Matteo Acquaviva, whose son Belisario was the first Duke of Nardò, and promoted the Renaissance in the city.

In 1647 the city rebelled against the Spanish domination, but the viceroyal troops suppressed the riot with heavy terms.

== Nardò DOC ==
The area around Nardò produces red and rose Italian DOC wines. The grapes are limited to a harvest yield of 18 tonnes/ha with the finished needing a minimum alcohol level of 12.5%. The wines are primarily composed of 80-100% Negroamaro with Montepulciano and Malvasia Nera permitted to fill in the remaining 20%.

== Main sights ==
- The Piazza Salandra is the center of the town.
- Nardò Cathedral, built around 1000 AD. It has an 18th-century façade, but the interior has maintained the Romanesque-Gothic original appearance.
- Church of San Domenico (16th-18th centuries). It has a highly decorated façade with Baroque caryatids, columns and vegetable figures.
- Chiesa del Carmine, with a fine Renaissance portal.
- Church of San Cosimo (1618)
- Temple of the Osanna (1603)
- Nardò Ring in Nardò is used as a test track for driving at high speeds.

== People ==
- Daniele Greco, triple jumper
- Amanda Lamb, British model
- Fabrizio Miccoli, footballer
- Giuliano Sangiorgi, singer-songwriter

== Sister cities ==
- Atlit, Israel
- Fiorano Modenese, Italy
- Conversano, Italy
- Gyumri, Armenia

== In film ==
Nardò is the location of the Tomatina-inspired tomato festival in the 2014 British musical film, Walking on Sunshine.

Sei mai stata sulla Luna? (2015)

== Climate ==
Climate data for Nardò (1991–2020)
Month	Jan	Feb	Mar	Apr	May	Jun	Jul	Aug	Sep	Oct	Nov	Dec	Year
Mean daily maximum °C (°F)	13.1 (55.6)	14.0 (57.2)	16.4 (61.5)	19.7 (67.5)	24.6 (76.3)	29.4 (84.9)	32.2 (90.0)	32.0 (89.6)	27.1 (80.8)	22.8 (73.0)	18.2 (64.8)	14.4 (57.9)	22.0 (71.6)
Daily mean °C (°F)	9.5 (49.1)	10.2 (50.4)	12.2 (54.0)	15.3 (59.5)	19.8 (67.6)	24.4 (75.9)	27.0 (80.6)	27.0 (80.6)	22.7 (72.9)	18.6 (65.5)	14.5 (58.1)	10.8 (51.4)	17.7 (63.8)
Mean daily minimum °C (°F)	5.8 (42.4)	6.4 (43.5)	8.1 (46.6)	10.8 (51.4)	15.0 (59.0)	19.3 (66.7)	21.9 (71.4)	22.0 (71.6)	18.4 (65.1)	14.5 (58.1)	10.8 (51.4)	7.3 (45.1)	13.4 (56.0)
Average precipitation mm (inches)	63 (2.5)	54 (2.1)	68 (2.7)	38 (1.5)	28 (1.1)	20 (0.8)	18 (0.7)	32 (1.3)	54 (2.1)	81 (3.2)	91 (3.6)	81 (3.2)	628 (24.8)
Average relative humidity (%)	82	77	75	74	70	66	63	67	71	77	81	83	74
Source 1: Istituto Superiore per la Protezione e la Ricerca Ambientale
Source 2: Il Meteo (precipitation and humidity)

== See also ==
- A.S.D. Nardò Calcio
- Diocese of Nardò-Gallipoli
