= Arnesano =

- Comune
- Comune di Arnesano
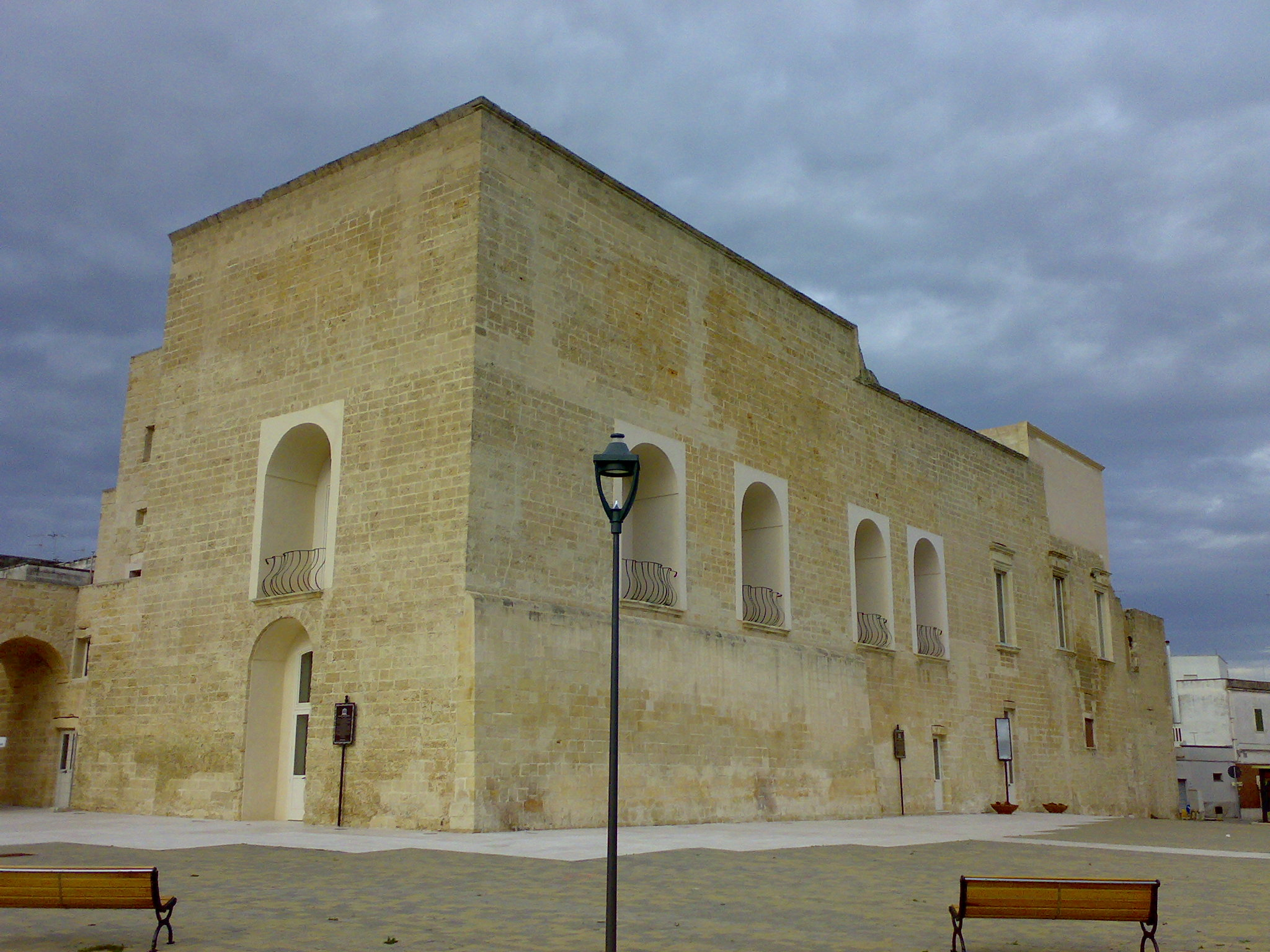
- Feudal palace.

- Location within Italy Location within Apulia
- Coordinates: 40°20′N 18°6′E
- Country: Italy
- Region: Apulia
- Province: Lecce (LE)
- Frazioni: Rione Riesci

Government
  - Mayor: Emanuele Solazzo

Area
  - Total: 13.56 km^{2} (5.24 sq mi)
- Elevation: 33 m (108 ft)

Population (30 Aprile 2017)
  - Total: 4,073
  - Density: 300.4/km^{2} (778.0/sq mi)
- Demonym: Arnesanesi
- Time zone: UTC+1 (CET)
  - Summer (DST): UTC+2 (CEST)
- Postal code: 73010
- Dialing code: 0832
- ISTAT code: 075007
- Patron saint: Crucifix Jesus
- Saint day: First Sunday in July
- Website: Official website

Arnesano (Salentino: Arnisanu) is a town and comune in the Italian province of Lecce in the Apulia region of south-east Italy.
