= Andrea Matteo Acquaviva =

Italian nobleman and condottiero (1458–1529)

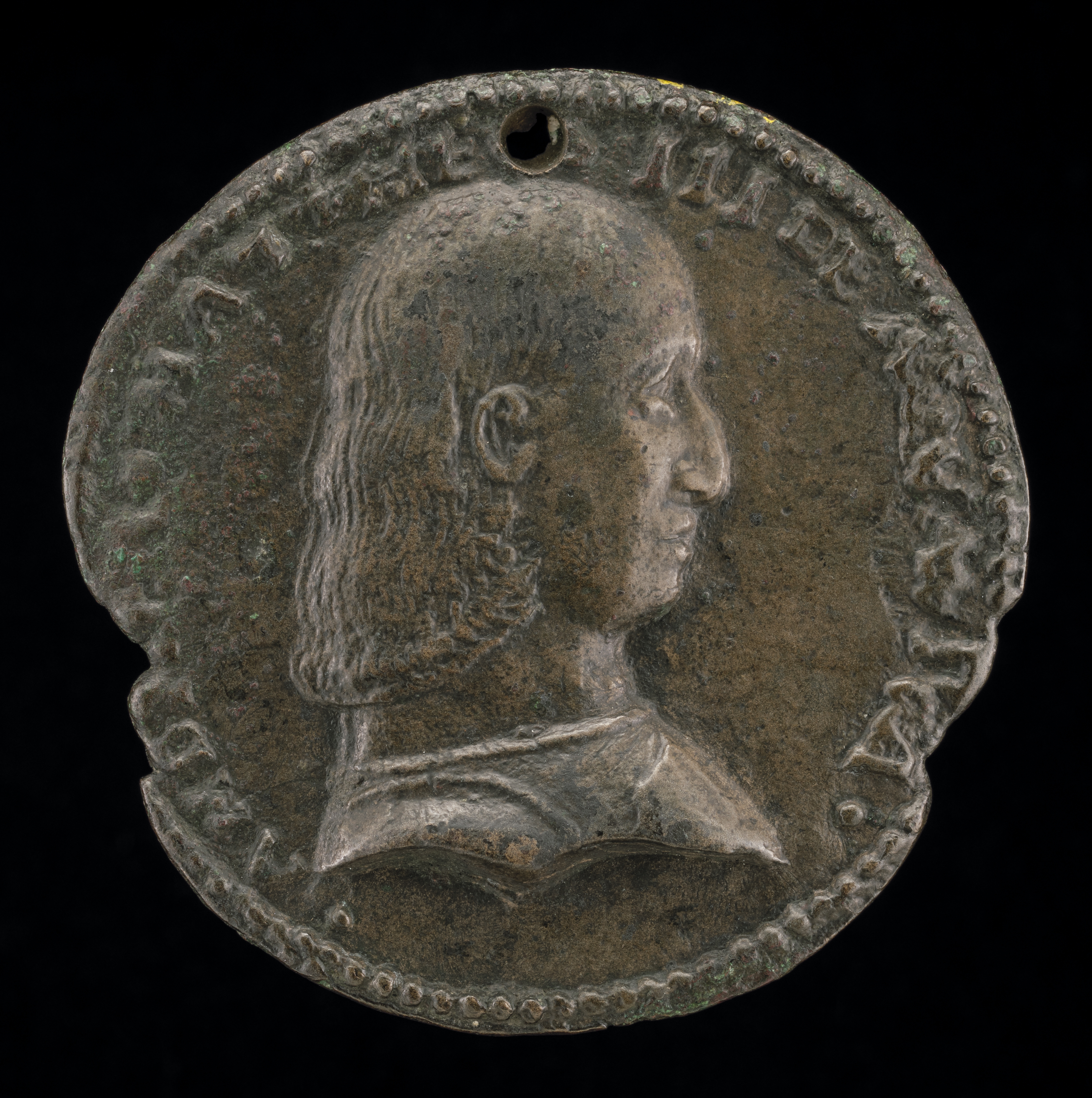
- Born: 1458
- Died: Conversano
- Children: Gianantonio-Donato Acquaviva d'Aragona, 9.Duca d'Atri
- Mother: Caterina Orsini, Contessa di Conversano

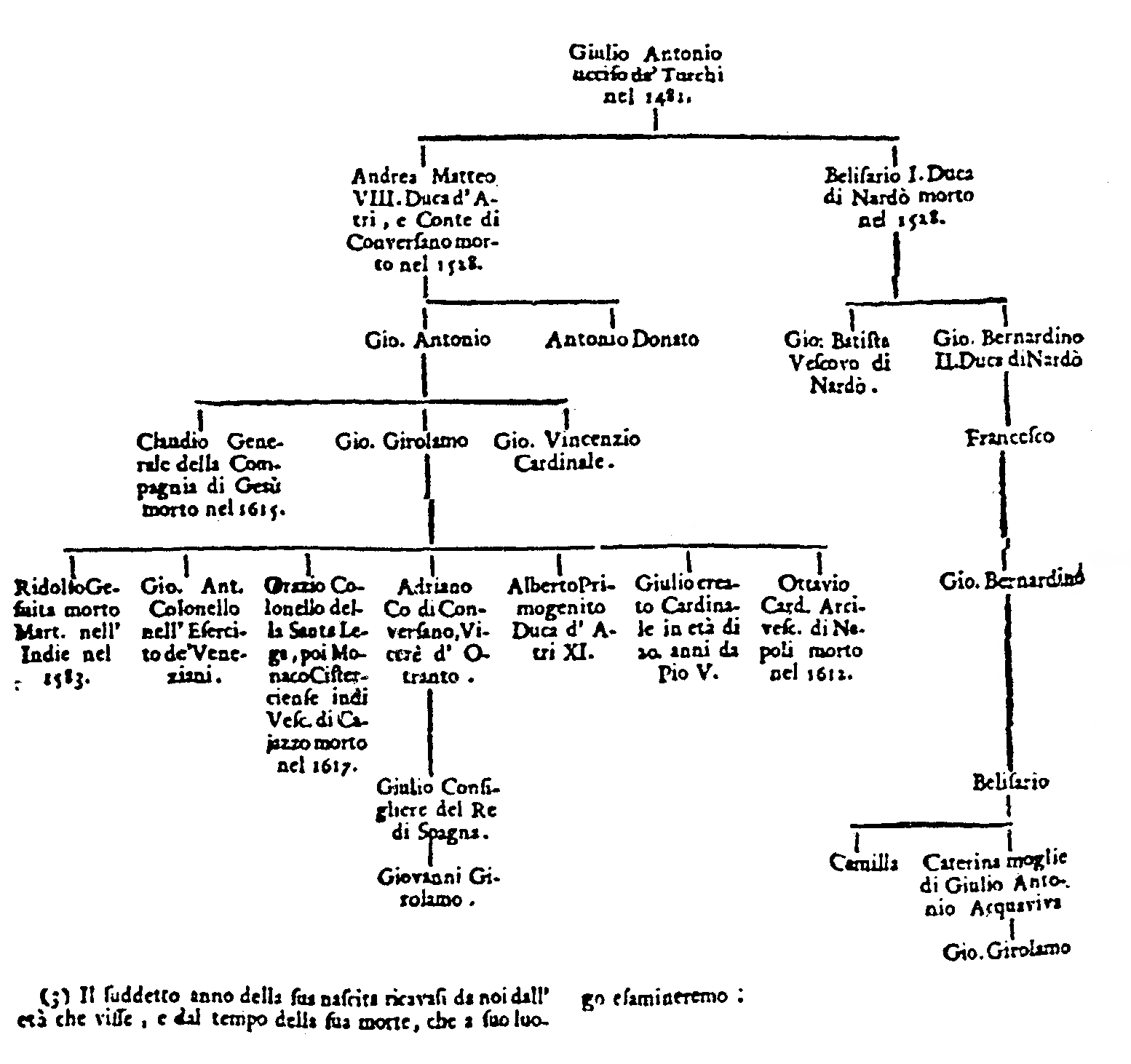
Acquaviva family tree

Andrea Matteo Acquaviva, 8th Duke of Atri (1458–1529) was an Italian nobleman and condottiero from the Kingdom of Naples. Born in Conversano, Puglia, he was the second son of Duke Giulio Antonio Acquaviva and his wife, Caterina Orsini del Balzo. She was a first cousin of Queen Isabella, the wife of King Ferrante of Naples.

He and his brothers were educated in Naples by the humanist scholar Giovanni Pontano. In 1464, he became Marquis of Bitonto. In September 1477, Andrea Matteo married Isabella Piccolomini of Aragon, the daughter of King Ferrante's natural daughter, Maria of Aragon. Maria's husband, Antonio Todeschini Piccolomini, Duke of Amalfi, was a nephew of Pope Pius II and brother of Pope Pius III. In 1478, he purchased from the royal state property the fief of Sternatia in Terra di Otranto.

He was prepared by his father for a life of arms, fighting with him in Tuscany (1478) and then in Otranto against the Turks in 1481. His elder brother Giovanni Antonio died in Pisa in 1479. Upon the death of his father in Otranto, Andrea Matteo, as the elder surviving son, inherited the title of Duke of Atri and Count of S. Flaviano, which made him feudal lord of much of Abruzzo. He also received the maternal fiefdoms with the title of Count of Conversano. In 1482, during the War of Ferrara, he fought for Ferdinand I of Naples on behalf of the king's son-in-law, Ercole I d'Este, Duke of Ferrara against Pope Sixtus IV and his Venetian allies.

In 1485, he joined the Conspiracy of the Barons, perhaps because the Aragonese did not want to return Teramo to Acquaviva. Eventually defeated, he was one of the few barons spared, due to the intervention of his father-in-law, Antonio Piccolomini, who happened to be the King's son-in-law.

Andrea Matteo distinguished himself as a partisan of the French. He was made prisoner by Consalvo of Cordova and carried into Spain; but his confinement was not long; and on his return to Naples he became a patron of letters. He was kept away from political life, due to suspicion of his past as an advocate of the French cause. In 1510, Andrea Matteo and other barons assembled in Naples Cathedral to protest the introduction of the Spanish Inquisition into the territory. The following year, he returns the collar of the French Order of Saint Michael. He died in Puglia in 1529.

To literary men, he was indeed a benefactor—hence the encomia which have been lavished upon him, and which, more than any merit of his own, obtained him distinction. Yet he wrote one book at least, a commentary on the Latin translation of Plutarch's Moralia. A member of the Accademia Pontaniana, he was one of the most important humanist princes in southern Italy.
