= Grand title of the emperor of Austria =

Crowns, titles, and dignities used from 1804 to 1918

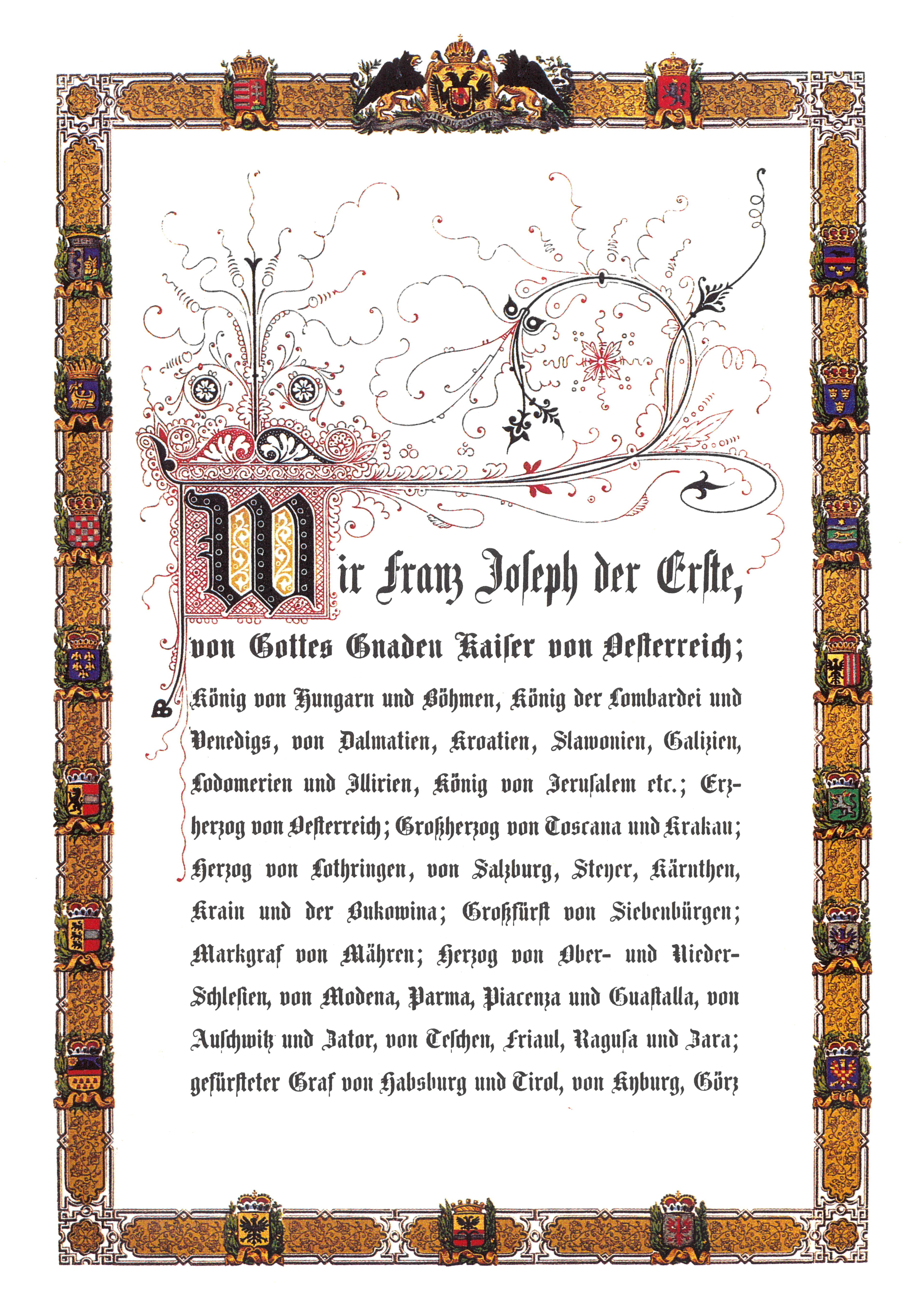
First page of the February Patent of 1861 with the grand title of the emperor

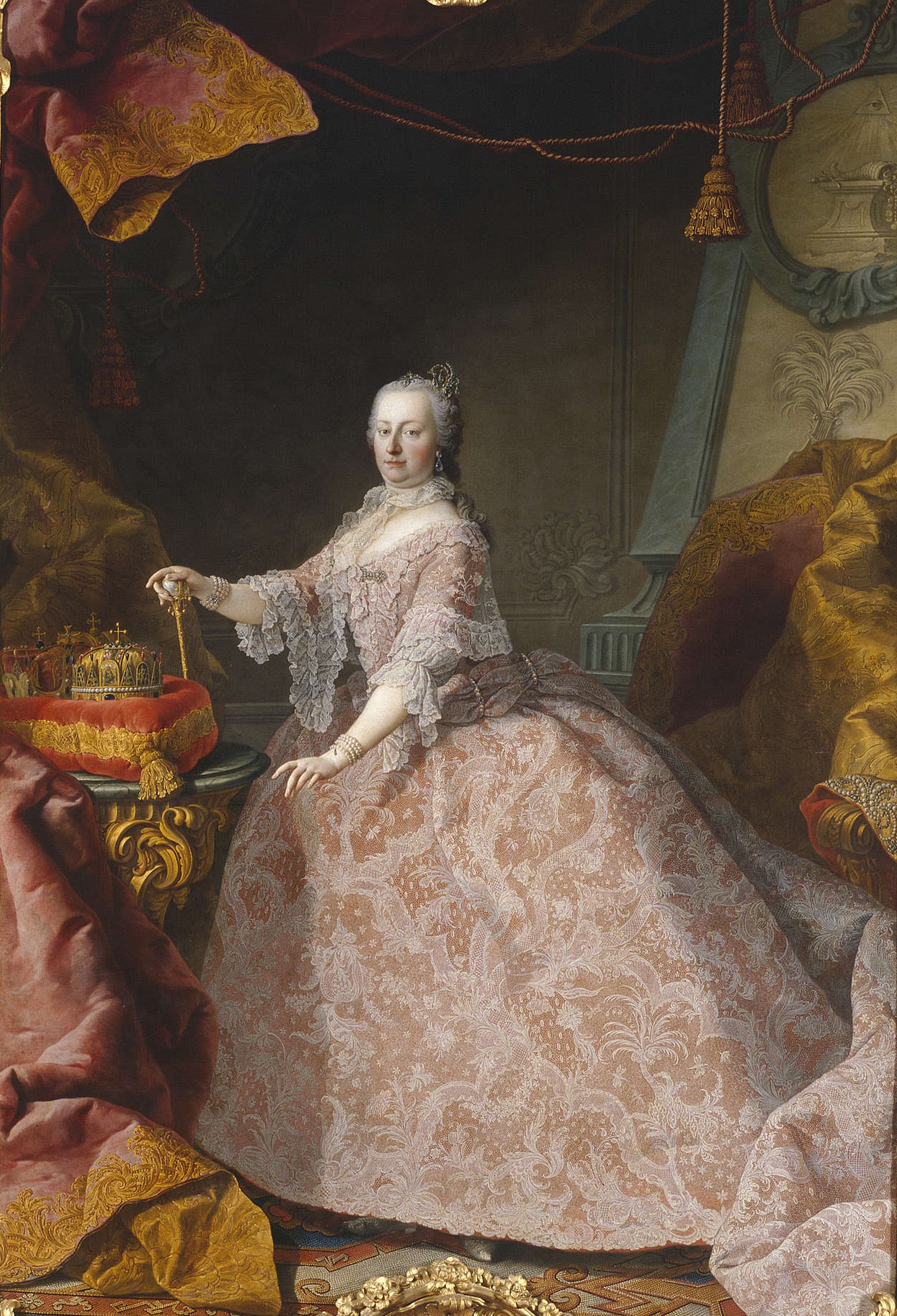
Empress Maria Theresa, on her right are the crowns of the Erblande, Hungary, Bohemia and the coronet of the Archduchy of Austria. (by Martin van Meytens, 1752/1753)

The grand title of the emperor of Austria (German: Großer Titel des Kaisers von Österreich) was the vast lists of the crowns, titles, and dignities which the emperors of Austria carried from the foundation of the empire in 1804 until the end of the monarchy in 1918.

After the House of Habsburg established itself in the 11th century, it grew in power. Vast numbers of domains were added to its empire in Central and Eastern Europe and Western Europe. The throne of the Holy Roman Empire was continuously occupied by the Habsburgs between 1438 and 1740, and again between 1745 and the dissolution of the Holy Roman Empire in 1806. The house also produced kings of Bohemia, Germany, Hungary, Croatia, Portugal, Spain, England and Ireland, as well as rulers of Dutch and Italian principalities amongst others.

The Austrian Empire was declared as the Holy Roman Empire dissolved itself and became a successor state. The former Holy Roman Emperor Francis II became the Emperor of Austria. In accordance with tradition and the titles that were already held, he promulgated the grand title to codify the most important monarchical titles of vast numbers of countries and territories under Habsburg rule, and also of titular rulers of former possessions. With the Austro-Hungarian Compromise of 1867 the grand title was again slightly modified. Although the Austrian emperor was also the nominal head of the German Confederation, this was not included in the grand title.

The grand title was not a complete listing of all the titles held; instead it ends with an etc. twice. There were also a middle title and a small title. The empress was also given the feminine version of the title.

== Grand title ==
The full title (in German) of the Austro-Hungarian monarch as of 1914 was:

Seine Kaiserliche und Königliche Apostolische Majestät
N.N.
von Gottes Gnaden Kaiser von Österreich,
König von Ungarn und Böhmen, von Dalmatien, Kroatien, Slawonien, Galizien, Lodomerien und Illyrien;
König von Jerusalem etc.;
Erzherzog von Österreich;
Großherzog von Toskana und Krakau;
Herzog von Lothringen, von Salzburg, Steyer, Kärnten, Krain und der Bukowina;
Großfürst von Siebenbürgen, Markgraf von Mähren;
Herzog von Ober- und Niederschlesien, von Modena, Parma, Piacenza und Guastalla, von Auschwitz und Zator, von Teschen, Friaul, Ragusa und Zara;
Gefürsteter Graf von Habsburg und Tirol, von Kyburg, Görz und Gradisca;
Fürst von Trient und Brixen;
Markgraf von Ober- und Niederlausitz und in Istrien;
Graf von Hohenems, Feldkirch, Bregenz, Sonnenberg etc.;
Herr von Triest, von Cattaro und auf der Windischen Mark;
Großwojwode der Woiwodschaft Serbien
etc., etc.

which translates to:

His Imperial and Royal Apostolic Majesty,
N.N.
By the Grace of God Emperor of Austria,
King of Hungary and Bohemia, Dalmatia, Croatia, Slavonia, Galicia, Lodomeria and Illyria;
King of Jerusalem, etc.;
Archduke of Austria;
Grand Duke of Tuscany and Cracow;
Duke of Lorraine, Salzburg, Styria, Carinthia, Carniola and Bukovina;
Grand Prince of Transylvania, Margrave of Moravia;
Duke of Upper and Lower Silesia, of Modena, Parma, Piacenza and Guastalla, of Auschwitz and Zator, of Teschen, Friaul, Ragusa and Zara;
Princely Count of Habsburg and Tyrol, of Kyburg, Gorizia and Gradisca;
Prince of Trento and Brixen;
Margrave of Upper and Lower Lusatia and in Istria;
Count of Hohenems, Feldkirch, Bregenz, Sonnenberg etc.;
Lord of Trieste, of Cattaro and on the Windic March;
Grand Voivode of the Voivodeship of Serbia
etc., etc.

== Explanation of the individual titles listed in the grand title in their order ==
=== Emperor of Austria ===
In 1804 Holy Roman Emperor Francis II foresaw the dissolution of the Holy Roman Empire, so he sought to preserve his family's imperial status by creating the new title "Hereditary Emperor of Austria".

=== Apostolic King of Hungary, King of Bohemia ===
The kingdoms of Hungary and Bohemia were originally elective monarchies, but like many elective monarchies heredity was followed. Ferdinand, the future Holy Roman Emperor, married Anne of Bohemia and Hungary, the daughter of King Vladislaus II (who held both kingdoms), and when Vladislaus' son died Ferdinand was elected in 1526. Eventually his descendants made the throne hereditary in Bohemia (1620) and Hungary (1687).

=== King of Dalmatia ===
Traditionaly the first ruler to hold this title was Croatian King Stephen Držislav. Trough his mother Queen Helen of Zadar, he secured Byzantine support and was given authority over the Byzantine Theme of Dalmatia. His official title was Reges Dalmatie et Chroatie. Following his death, the Croatian Kingdom descended into civil war, and the Dalmatian cities recognised Venetian rule. Venetian Doges never claimed the title of King, instead in year 1000, Doge Pietro II Orseolo adopted the title Dux Dalmatiae, the Duke of Dalmatia. Title of King was restored during the reign of Petar Kresimir IV in 1069, when his authority over Dalmatia was recognised by Byzantine Empire. Kings of Hungary adopted the title after Coloman secured the allegiance of the Dalmatian cities following a brief war in 1105. He was crowned King of Dalmatia in Zadar in 1106. Both titles; King (Hungary) and Duke (Venice) remained in use until 1433, when Emperor Sigismund renounced his claims and formally confirmed Venetian authority over Dalmatia. Subsequent rulers of Hungary and Croatia as well as Holy Roman Emperors continued to style themselves as Kings of Dalmatia, despite exercising no actual authority over the region, which remained under Venetian rule until 1797. In 1804, when Francis II (I) established the title of Emperor of Austria he also adopted the title of King of Dalmatia (Dalmatiae Rex).

=== King of Croatia ===
In 1102 the Croatian nobles agreed to share the same King as Hungary. In 1527 Ferdinand I was elected king of Croatia, and the title made hereditary.

=== King of Slavonia ===
In the 1490s King Vladislaus II of Hungary officially included Slavonia into the royal title. In 1526 when Ferdinand I was elected king he inherited the title and passed it to his descendants.

=== King of Galicia and Lodomeria ===
Galicia and Lodomeria was annexed by Austria in the First Partition of Poland, creating a new kingdom for the Habsburgs. The title had been claimed by the Kings of Hungary in the Middle Ages.

=== King of Illyria ===
With the re-annexation of the Illyrian provinces in 1815 the Habsburgs created a new crown land, the Kingdom of Illyria. Although abolished in 1848, the title was kept.

=== King of Jerusalem ===
The Kingdom of Jerusalem was abolished upon its conquest by the Egyptian Mamluks in 1291 AD. The Habsburgs were one of many dynasties to claim the title. They inherited it through the House of Lorraine. In the 18th century, the title was added by Leopold I of Lorraine, Francis I's father, in order to claim a royal title.

=== Archduke of Austria ===
In 1282 King Rudolf I of Germany enfeoffed his sons with the Duchies of Austria and Styria. His descendant Frederick III, Holy Roman Emperor officially elevated it to an archduchy in 1453, confirming a 1356 forgery by Duke Rudolf IV.

=== Grand Duke of Tuscany ===
Following the War of the Polish Succession, future Holy Roman Emperor Francis I was forced to exchange his native Duchy of Lorraine for the Grand Duchy of Tuscany. He later passed the grand duchy to a younger son, but the main branch of the House of Habsburg-Lorraine continued to use the title.

=== Grand Duke of Kraków ===
The Free City of Kraków was incorporated into the Austrian Empire in 1846 following the Kraków Uprising, and transformed in a crown land under the name of the Grand Duchy of Kraków. It was later incorporated into Galicia.

=== Duke of Lorraine ===
The male line of the original House of Habsburg went extinct with Charles VI, Holy Roman Emperor. His daughter Maria Theresa married the aforementioned Francis, Duke of Lorraine (later Emperor Francis I), and their progeny became the House of Habsburg-Lorraine.

=== Duke of Styria ===
Rudolf I of Germany enfeoffed one of his sons as duke of Styria. The title passed down to the Leopoldian line, which became the sole remaining branch of the House of Habsburg after the death of King Ladislas the Posthumous, last descendant of the senior, Albertinian line.

=== Duke of Carinthia ===
In 1335 Otto, Duke of Austria was enfeoffed as Duke of Carinthia. The title passed down with the Leopoldian line.

=== Duke of Carniola ===
The March of Carniola was part of the Habsburg domains since Rudolf I of Germany, although it was leased to the House of Gorizia until 1335. In 1364, Rudolf IV, Duke of Austria elevated it to a duchy. The title passed down the Leopoldian line. After the death of Ferdinand I, the Inner Austrian domains (Carniola, Styria and Carinthia) were passed down to a junior branch which in 1619 took possession of the main Austrian Habsburg lands.

=== Duke of Bukovina ===
In 1775 the Habsburgs annexed the northernmost part of the Principality of Moldavia and created the Duchy of Bukovina out of it.

=== Grand Prince of Transylvania ===
In the 16th century Transylvania was conquered by the Ottomans from Hungary and created as a separate principality. In 1711 the Habsburgs reclaimed it and added the Principality of Transylvania to their titles. In 1765 it was elevated to a Grand Principality.

=== Margrave of Moravia ===
Moravia was a Crown Land of Bohemia; thus when the Habsburgs became Kings of Bohemia they also acquired Moravia.

=== Duke of Upper and Lower Silesia ===
Silesia was originally owned by the Kingdom of Poland, but it was gradually broken up and acquired by Bohemia as a crown land. After losing most of historic Silesia to Prussia in the Silesian Wars, the Habsburgs consolidated what remained into Austrian Silesia.

=== Duke of Modena ===
Maria Beatrice Ricciarda d'Este, daughter of the last duke of the House of Este, married Ferdinand Karl, Archduke of Austria-Este, allowing this title to pass to the Habsburgs. It was subsequently lost to Sardinia during the unification of Italy.

=== Duke of Parma, Piacenza, and Guastalla ===
Charles VI, Holy Roman Emperor acquired the Duchy of Parma and Piacenza after the War of the Polish Succession, but his daughter Maria Theresa lost it after the War of the Austrian Succession. The Habsburgs controlled the Duchy of Guastalla between 1746-1748 following the death of Giuseppe Maria Gonzaga, but it was then also lost in the same war.

=== Duke of Auschwitz and Zator ===
Historically one of the duchies of Silesia, it was acquired by the Polish kings in the 16th century and incorporated into the Polish–Lithuanian Commonwealth. The Habsburgs acquired this title in the First Partition of Poland.

=== Duke of Teschen ===
The Duchy of Teschen was one of the Silesian Duchies that were part of the Bohemian Crown Lands. It was granted to Leopold, Duke of Lorraine as a compensation for Mantua and Montferrat. When Leopold's son Francis I married Maria Theresa of Austria, the title returned to the House of Habsburg-Lorraine.

=== Duke of Friaul ===
This title was created by Maximilian I during the Italian wars in the early 16th century. Friuli had been part of the Holy Roman Empire, but it was lost to the Republic of Venice in 1420. The title was created in order to strengthen the Emperor's claim to the region, but the Habsburgs acquired Friuli only in 1797 with the Treaty of Campo Formio, and then again after Napoleon's defeat. It was lost to Italy in 1866.

=== Duke of Ragusa ===
Ragusa (modern-day Dubrovnik) was a maritime republic, which in the late Middle Ages recognized the suzerainty of the Hungarian kings. It was abolished by Napoleon in 1808 and incorporated to Austrian Dalmatia after his defeat, when the title was created.

=== Duke of Zara ===
Zara (or Zadar) is a city in Dalmatia, modern-day Croatia. In the Middle Ages, it was contested between the Kingdom of Hungary and the Republic of Venice. It was considered an integral part of the Kingdom of Dalmatia by both parts, but the title was assumed by the Hungarian kings in order to assert their rights over the city. It became a Habsburg domain for the first time with the Treaty of Campo Formio in 1797, and then again in 1813 after Napoleon's defeat.

=== Princely Count of Habsburg ===
Habsburg was the original seat of the House of Habsburg.

=== Princely Count of Tyrol ===
Duke Rudolf IV of Austria acquired the County of Tyrol in 1363.

=== Princely Count of Kyburg ===
Rudolf I of Germany claimed the County of Kyburg when its ruling dynasty went extinct. A brief period of rule by the city of Zürich became permanent from 1452 when it was used as collateral for a loan the Habsburgs never repaid; they continued to use the title despite no longer being in possession of the land.

=== Princely Count of Gorizia and Gradisca ===
The Habsburgs acquired the County of Gorizia (German Görz) in 1500. In 1647, the nearby town of Gradisca and the surrounding area on the right bank of the Isonzo river was elevated to an immediate status and given to the Eggenberg family as a principality. After their extinction in 1754, it was again merged with Gorizia as the Princely County of Gorizia and Gradisca.

=== Prince of Trent ===
In the 1300s Trent was annexed by Tyrol and thus was controlled by the Habsburgs.

=== Prince of Brixen ===
In 1803 the Prince-Bishopric of Brixen was secularized and annexed by the Habsburgs.

=== Margrave of Upper and Lower Lusatia ===
Lusatia was a Crown Land of Bohemia, but was given to the Electorate of Saxony in the Peace of Prague (1635).

=== Margrave in Istria ===
Central Istria was acquired by the Habsburgs in the late 14th century. In 1466, they acquired the eastern parts, as well, and added their Istrian possessions to the Duchy of Carniola. With the annexation of Venetian Istria in 1797, the Habsburgs joined all their Istrian possessions into one unit and revived this title which had been abandoned in the late 13th century.

=== Count of Hohenems ===
When the male line of the original counts of Hohenems died out in 1759 the county came under suzerainty of the House of Habsburg.

=== Count of Feldkirch ===
When the last count of Feldkirch Frederick VII died in 1436 the county passed back under the suzerainty of the House of Habsburg.

=== Count of Bregenz ===
After 1451 the title of count of Bregenz was held by the House of Habsburg and Bregenz was incorporated into the Duchy of Austria.

=== Count of Sonnenberg ===
Sonnenberg was a partition of Waldburg and was annexed by the Archduchy of Austria in 1511.

=== Lord of Trieste ===
By the Treaty of Turin (1381), Venice renounced its claim to Trieste and the leading citizens of Trieste petitioned Leopold III of Habsburg, Duke of Austria, to make Trieste part of his domains.

=== Lord of Cattaro ===
After the Treaty of Campo Formio in 1797, it passed to the Habsburg Monarchy. However, in 1805, it was assigned to the French Empire's client state, the Napoleonic Kingdom of Italy by the Treaty of Pressburg, although in fact held by a Russian squadron under Dmitry Senyavin. It was restored to the Habsburg monarchy by the Congress of Vienna.

=== Lord on the Windic March ===
Since the 11th century, Carniola was known under the double name of Carniola and the Windic March. In 1282, a cadet branch of the House of Gorizia was enfeoffed with part of the region, which became known as the County in Metlika and in the Windic March. In 1374, the county was acquired to the House of Habsburg who assumed the title of Lords of the Windic March.

=== Grand Voivode of the Voivodeship of Serbia ===
The Voivodeship was formed by a decision of the Austrian Emperor in November 1849, after the Revolutions of 1848/1849. It was formed in accordance with privilege given to Serbs by the Habsburg emperor in 1691, recognizing the right of Serbs to territorial autonomy within the Habsburg Monarchy.

=== Etc. Etc. ===
Countless other kingdoms including Poland, Low Countries, Germany, Italy, Bulgaria, Cumania, etc. etc.

== Subsequent use ==
After 1918, the grand title was invoked for historical commemorative reasons in two Habsburg burial ceremonies in Vienna.

At the burial of the last empress, Zita (1916–1918), on 1 April 1989 in the imperial mausoleum, three prayers were said for the deceased by a speaker commissioned by the family, before the gate was opened and the sarcophagus was borne into the mausoleum. The first prayer started with the feminine form of the grand title: "Zita, Empress of Austria, crowned Queen of Hungary, Queen of Bohemia ...". In the list of ducal titles, the title of Duchess of Parma claimed by the Habsburgs was omitted, as she had a closer tie to Parma. Her father, Robert of Parma, was the last Duke of Parma (1854-1860) and as a pretender to that title she was a princess, even though she was not born until 1892. Thus the title ended with "Infanta of Spain, Princess of Portugal and of Parma".

Zita's son Otto von Habsburg was buried on 16 July 2011, and a prayer was said in the mausoleum: "Otto of Austria, first Crown Prince of Austria-Hungary, royal prince of Hungary and Bohemia ..." The titles of King of Jerusalem and Archduke of Austria were omitted. No Austrian emperor was actually sovereign over Jerusalem, and in 1961 Otto had renounced all claims of sovereignty in the Republic of Austria.

== See also ==
- List of rulers of Austria
- List of Austrian consorts
- List of heirs to the Austrian throne
- History of Austria
