= County of Guastalla =

Italian county (1406–1621)

Coordinates: 44°55′N 10°40′E

County of Guastalla Cuntea de Guastàla (Emilian)
- 1406–1621
- Coat of arms under the Torelli family

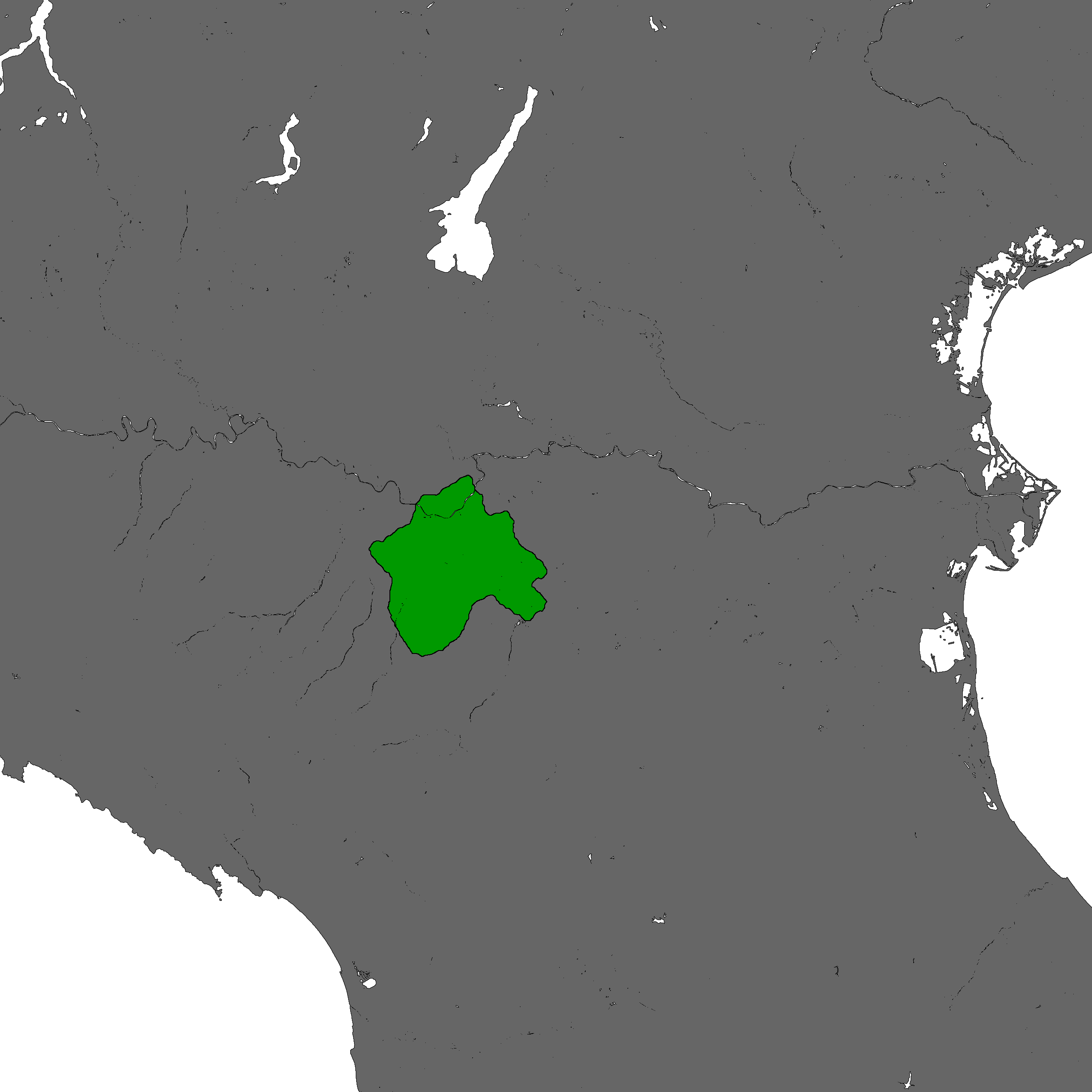
- The county of Guastalla (1450)
- Capital: Guastalla
- Common languages: Emilian; Lombard
- Religion: Roman Catholicism
- Government: County
- Count
  - 1406–1449: Guido Torelli (first)
  - 1575–1621: Ferrante II Gonzaga (last)
- History
  - Created for the Torelli family: 1406
  - Partitioned to create Montechiarugolo: 1456
  - Purchased by Ferrante Gonzaga: 1539
  - Reacquired Montechiarugolo: 1612
  - Raised to duchy by Ferdinand II: 2 July 1621
- Currency: Guastalla lira
Preceded by	Succeeded by
Lordship of Guastalla	Duchy of Guastalla
- Today part of: Italy

The County of Guastalla (Italian: Contea di Guastalla) was an Italian state, centered on the city of Guastalla in Northern Italy, which existed from 1428 to 1621, when it was then elevated to a Duchy.

== History ==
The title of count was conferred in 1428 on Guido Torelli for the services rendered to the Duke of Milan, Filippo Maria Visconti. His descendants maintained the regency of the territory until 1539, when, finding themselves in financial straits, the family was forced to sell their domains, purchased by Ferrante Gonzaga. From that moment Guastalla significantly increased its prestige. Gonzaga was in fact one of the most influential men of his time, from a political and military point of view. When he died in 1557, his inheritance passed to his firstborn Cesare I Gonzaga, who definitively established his court in Guastalla in 1567. Many works such as the church, the mint, Via Gonzaga and the completion of the ducal palace were built by him. In 1575 he was succeeded by his son Ferrante II.

Another branch of the Torelli family from Guastalla ruled the County of Montechiarugolo (separated from the county of Guastalla in 1456) until 1612.

== See also ==
- Guastalla
- Duchy of Guastalla
- List of rulers of Guastalla
- Duchy of Parma
- House of Gonzaga
- County of Montechiarugolo
- List of historic states of Italy
