= Eleonora Luisa Gonzaga =

- Duchess of Rovere and of Montefeltro
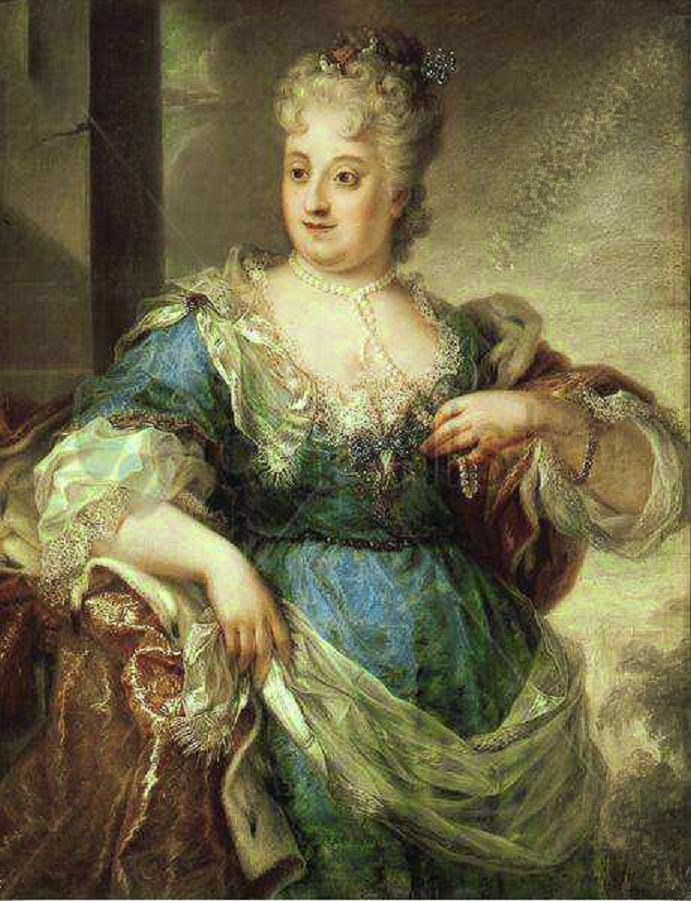
- Born: 13 November 1686; Guastalla, Duchy of Guastalla
- Died: 16 March 1741 (aged 54); Padua, Republic of Venice
- Burial: Basilica of Saint Anthony of Padua
- Spouse: Francesco Maria de' Medici
Names
- Eleonora Luisa Gonzaga
- House: House of Gonzaga {by birth); House of Medici (by marriage)
- Father: Vincenzo Gonzaga, Duke of Guastalla
- Mother: Maria Vittoria Gonzaga

Eleonora Luisa Gonzaga (13 November 1686 – 16 March 1741) was the Duchess of Rovere and Montefeltro as the wife of Francesco Maria de' Medici. She was the eldest child of Vincenzo Gonzaga, Duke of Guastalla and Sabbioneta and his second wife, Princess Maria Vittoria Gonzaga of Guastalla (1659-1707). She did not bear any children.

== Biography ==
Eleonora Luisa Gonzaga married Francesco Maria de' Medici, Duke of Rovere and Montefeltro (titles inherited from his mother) on 14 July 1709. Her husband was 48 years old and morbidly obese. Before the marriage occurred, Cosimo III de' Medici, Grand Duke of Tuscany, who instigated the marriage, sent agents to Guastalla to ascertain her physical appearance. They concluded that she had beautiful skin, eyes, mouth, and waist. The House of Medici was desperately wanting in male heirs; Francesco Maria, previously a cardinal, was released from his vows through his brother's action to remedy this.

Eleonora Luisa was repulsed by her husband, refusing to fulfil her marital duties. Despite requisitioning the assistance of her old confessor from Guastalla, Cosimo III could not cajole her into submitting, as she allegedly feared contracting venereal diseases. Francesco Maria had her surmount this predicament and eventually the marriage was consummated. However, no heirs were born and as a result of this, Francesco Maria was devastated.

On 2 February 1711, Francesco Maria died of dropsy, leaving behind exorbitant debts. Eleonora Luisa lingered on at Tuscany's court until the death of her nephew-in-law Gian Gastone de' Medici, Grand Duke of Tuscany. From there, she ventured to Padua in the Republic of Venice, where she died on 16 March 1741.

== Bibliography ==
- Acton, Harold: The Last Medici, Macmillan, London, 1980, ISBN 0-333-29315-0
