= Antonio Ferrante Gonzaga =

- Duke of Guastalla
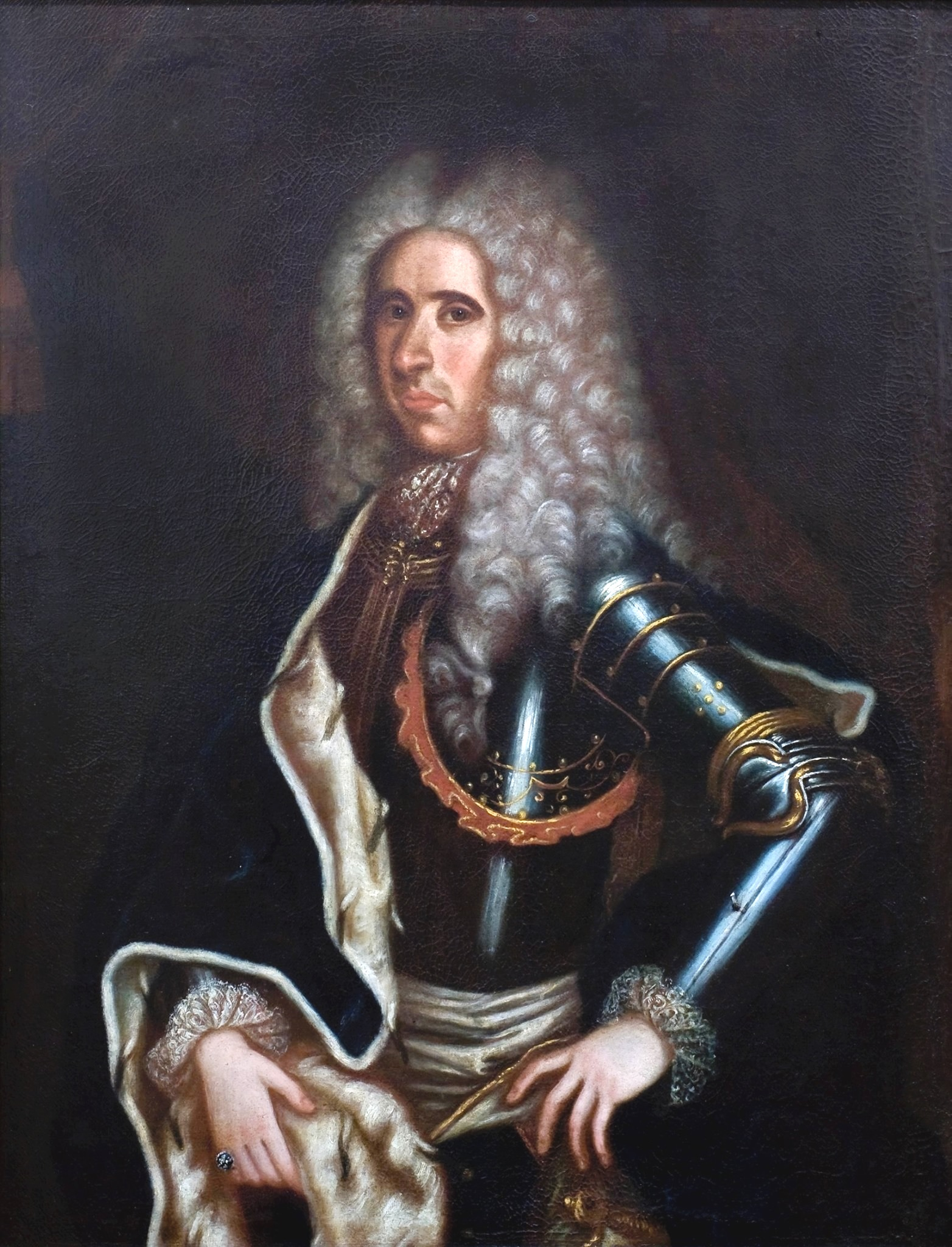

Duke of Guastalla
- Reign: 28 April 1714 – 16 April 1729
- Predecessor: Vincenzo Gonzaga
- Successor: Giuseppe Gonzaga
- Born: 9 December 1687
- Died: 16 April 1729 (aged 41)
- Spouse: Princess Theodora of Hesse-Darmstadt
- Father: Vincenzo Gonzaga, Duke of Guastalla
- Mother: Maria Gonzaga

Antonio Ferrante Gonzaga (9 December 1687 – 16 April 1729) was the reigning Duke of Guastalla and a member of the House of Gonzaga.

== Early life ==
Antonio was the son of Vincenzo Gonzaga, Duke of Guastalla and his second wife Maria Vittoria Gonzaga. His sister was Eleonora Luisa Gonzaga, sister in law to Cosimo III de' Medici, Grand Duke of Tuscany. Antonio succeeded his father in 1714.

== Personal life ==
Antonio was engaged to Princess Maria Karolina Sobieska, granddaughter of John III Sobieski but Maria Karolina (known as Charlotte) refused and married Frédéric Maurice Casimir de La Tour d'Auvergne, Prince of Turenne instead.

Antonio married first with Margherita Cesarini. After death of his first wife in 1725, he was remarried on 23 February 1727 in Darmstadt to Theodora of Hesse-Darmstadt, the only daughter of Prince Philip of Hesse-Darmstadt and Princess Marie Therese Ernestine of Croy-Havré. These marriages remained childless.

== Death ==
Antonio Ferrante was burned alive in an accident in his capital, Guastalla. After his death, the Duchy was inherited by his younger brother Giuseppe Gonzaga.

== Sources ==
- Parrott, David (1997). "A prince souverain and the French crown:Charles de Nevers, 1580-1637". In Oresko, Robert; Gibbs, G. C.; Scott, H. M. (eds.). Royal and Republican Sovereignty in Early Modern Europe. Cambridge University Press. pp. 149–187.

Preceded by Vincenzo I	Duke of Guastalla; 1714–1729	Succeeded by Giuseppe
