= Statue of Ferrante I Gonzaga, Guastalla =

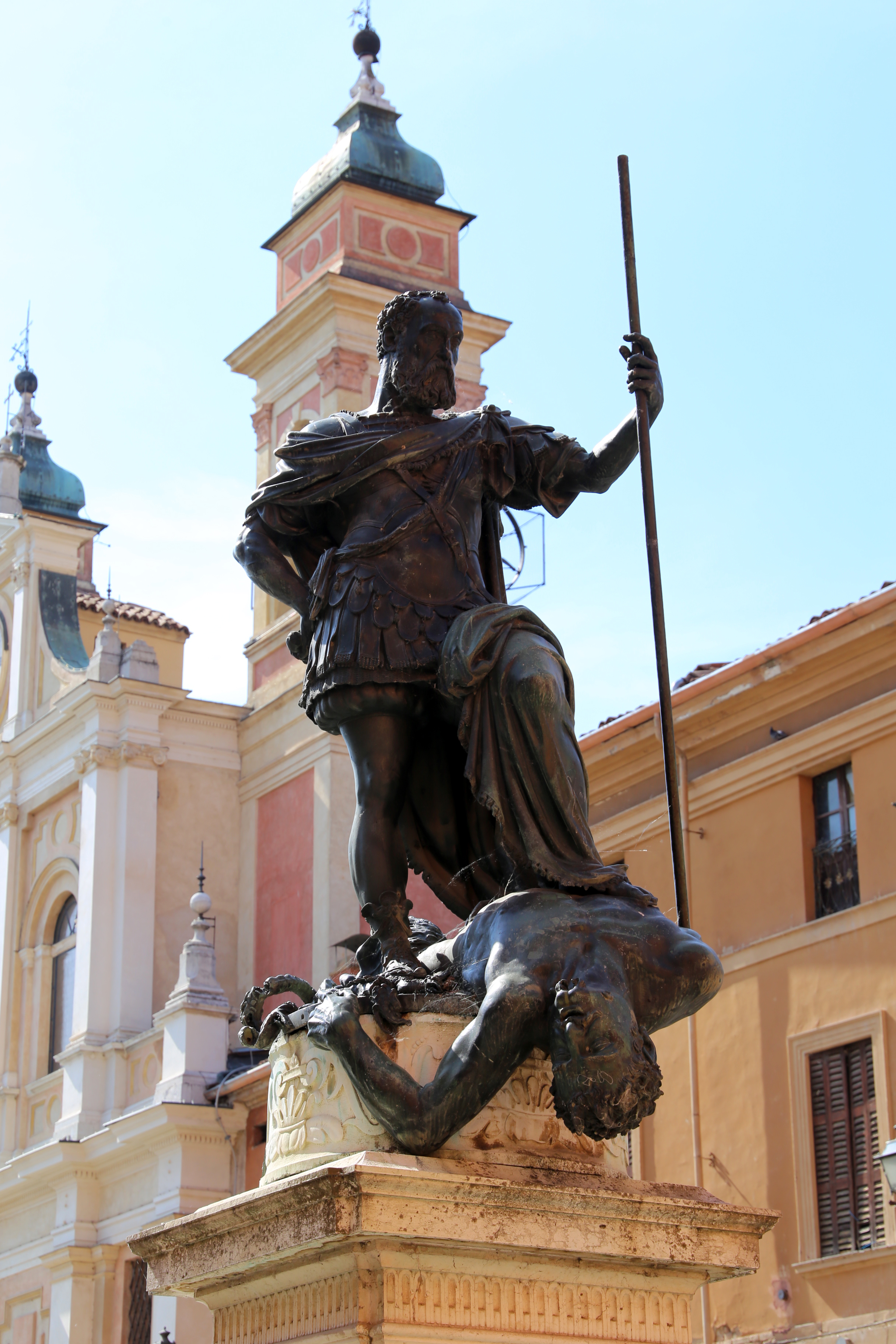
The Triumph of Ferrante Gonzaga over Envy by Leone Leoni, Guastalla, Italy.

The Statue of Ferrante I Gonzaga or the Triumph of Ferrante Gonzaga over Envy is a dramatic, outdoor, bronze, Italian Renaissance statue in the Piazza Gonzaga, in the center of Guastalla, a town in Emilia-Romagna, Italy. The statue depicting Ferrante Gonzaga, the former condottiero (1507–1557) was completed by Leone Leoni, and installed in 1594 by his son Cesare Gonzaga, who was also a military leader.

The condottiero Ferrante is depicted in a triumphant pose, trampling the chest of a vanquished satyr, symbol of vice, and another foot atop a decapitated puny hydra, symbol of calumny. Ferrante had been accused of disloyalty to the Holy Roman Emperor Charles V, but Ferrante cleared himself of the charges, appearing personally to defend himself before the emperor in Milan. The statue alludes to the episode.

The grim, violent posture of the statue sets the iconography apart from other, more restrained prior depictions of military leaders such as the equestrian statues of condottieri such as Gattamelata and Bartolomeo Colleoni. The pose of the statue appears to herald the transition from the sober and placid rigidity of Renaissance depictions to more vigorous and active Baroque poses.
