= Paolo della Stufa =

Italian scholar

Paolo della Stufa (1661 – 3 March 1711) was an Italian abbot, scholar, and writer who was an active member of the Academies of the Crusca and Arcadia. He is also known as Paolo di Alessando di Gismondo d'Andrea.

== Biography ==
He was born in Florence to Sigismondo della Stufa, Count of Calcione (in the Province of Arezzo). He served as abbot to the monastery of San Stefano d'Anghiari. As a young man, his erudition was recognized by admission to Accademia Fiorentina, and later the Accademia della Crusca. He moved to Rome to work as a secretary to Cardinal Francesco Maria de Medici. He was admitted to the Accademia degli Arcadi.

He translated from Latin a Compendio della Vita della beata Umiliana de' Cerchi; and from the French, the book of Antoine Arnauld: Arte di Pensare o Logica. He published in the reports of the pontifical Accademia degli Arcadi under the pseudonym of Sileno Perrasio. In 1691, he participated in the Arcadian's memorial ceremonies, led by the custodian Giovanni Mario Crescimbeni (under pseudonym of Alfesibio Cario), for Queen Christina of Sweden, a former patron of the academy.
