= Andrea Gonzaga =

Andrea Gonzaga, Count of San Paolo di Civitate (died 1686), was a member of the Italian House of Gonzaga, belonging to the cadet branch which ruled the Duchy of Guastalla.

== Biography ==
Andrea was the ninth son of Ferrante II Gonzaga, Duke of Guastalla, and his wife, Vittoria Doria, daughter of Giovanni Andrea Doria, 8th Prince of Melfi.

In 1626, Andrea bought from his father the fiefs of Serracapriola, Chieuti and San Paolo di Civitate, becoming Count of San Paolo. He married Laura Crispiano, of the family of the Marchesi of Fusara, with whom he had six children; one, Vincenzo was later sovereign Duke of Guastalla.

== See also ==
- Duchy of Guastalla
- House of Gonzaga

== Sources ==
- Parrott, David (1997). "A prince souverain and the French crown: Charles de Nevers, 1580-1637". In Oresko, Robert; Gibbs, G. C.; Scott, H. M. (eds.). Royal and Republican Sovereignty in Early Modern Europe: Essays in Memory of Ragnhild Hatton. Cambridge University Press.
