= Ferrante Gonzaga =

Italian soldier (1507–1557)

- Count of Guastalla
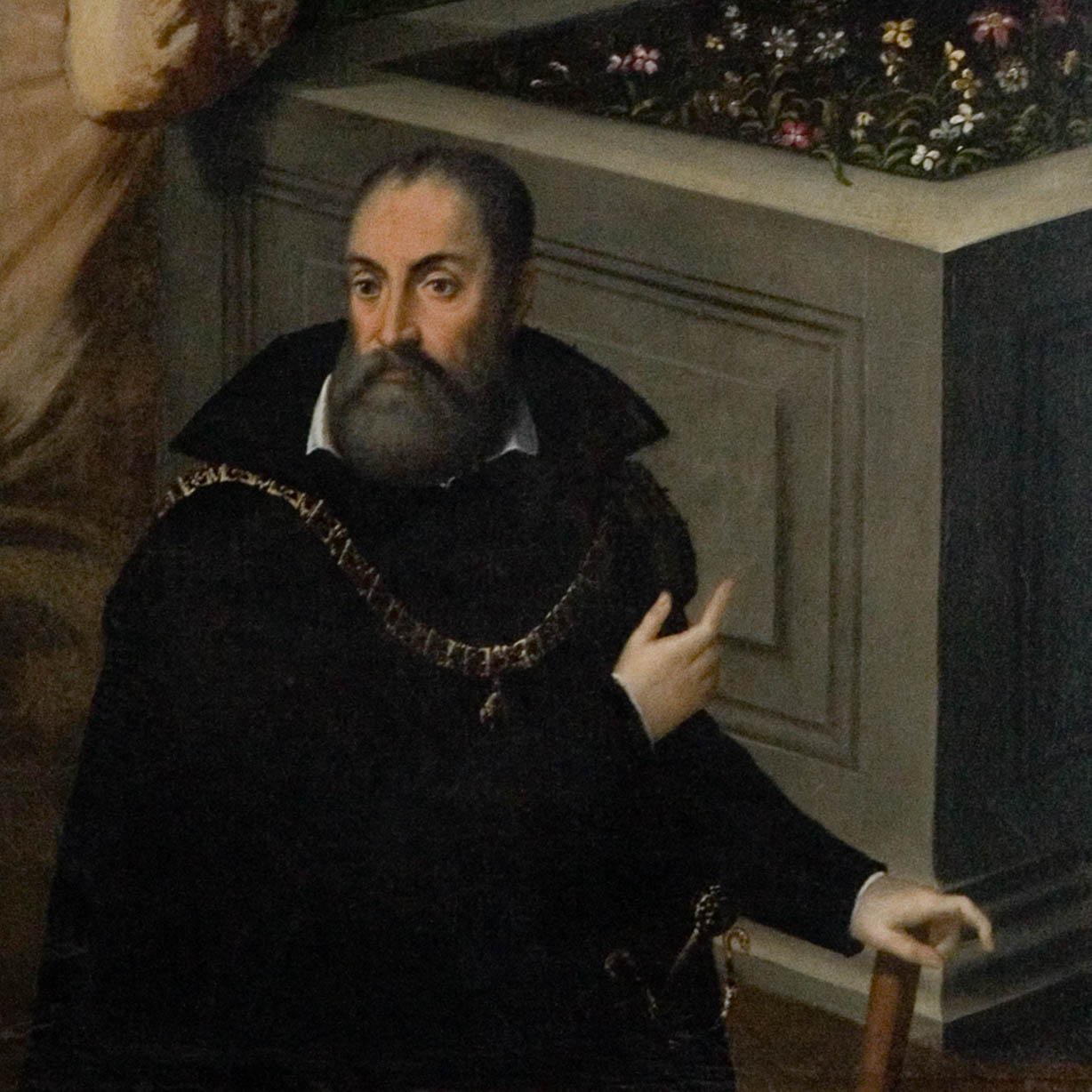
- Predecessor: none: founder of title
- Successor: Cesare I Gonzaga
- Born: 28 January 1507; Mantua
- Died: 15 November 1557 (aged 50); Brussels
- Noble family: House of Gonzaga
- Spouse: Isabella di Capua
- Issue: Anna; Cesare I Gonzaga; Ippolita; Francesco; Andrea; Gian Vincenzo; Ercole; Ottavio; Filippo; Geronima; Maria
- Father: Francesco II Gonzaga
- Mother: Isabella d'Este

Ferrante I Gonzaga (also Ferdinando I Gonzaga; 28 January 1507 – 15 November 1557) was an Italian condottiero, a member of the House of Gonzaga and the founder of the branch of the Gonzaga of Guastalla.

== Biography ==
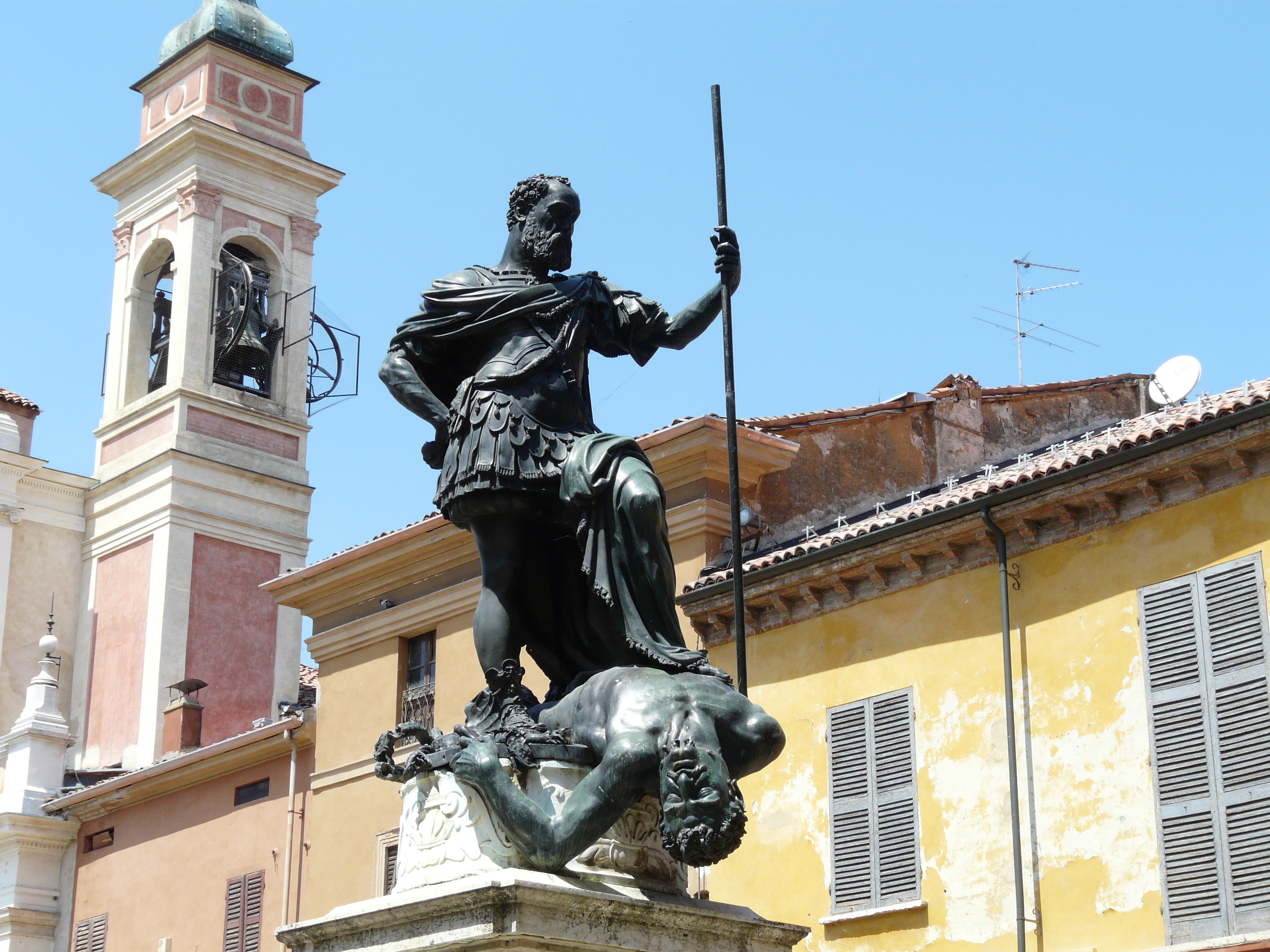
The Triumph of Ferrante Gonzaga over Envy by Leone Leoni, Guastalla, Italy

Ferrante was born in Mantua, the third son of Francesco II Gonzaga and Isabella d'Este. At the age of sixteen, he was sent to the court of Spain as a page to the future emperor Charles V, to whom Ferrante remained faithful for his whole life. In 1527 he took part in the Sack of Rome and attended Charles' triumphant coronation at Bologna in 1530: at the death of Charles of Bourbon (1527) he was appointed commander-in-chief of the Imperial army in Italy. He became a Knight in the Order of the Golden Fleece in 1531.

Ferrante defended Naples from the assault of the French troops under Odet of Foix, Viscount of Lautrec, and obtained the surrender of the Republic of Florence. For this feat Pope Clement VII, a member of the Medici who had been ousted from that city, named him papal governor of Benevento. Again for Charles V, he fought against the Turks at Tunis in 1535 and Algiers in 1541 with a contingent of 3,000 cavalry. He served Charles as Viceroy of Sicily (1535–1546), and Forte Gonzaga was named in his honour. He accompanied the Emperor to Germany in 1543 and fought the resolute campaign that enforced the Treaty of Crépy. He then served as Governor of the Duchy of Milan (1546–1554), in which role he fought in the War of Parma.

In 1529 Ferrante married Isabella di Capua, who brought him the fiefdoms of Molfetta and Giovinazzo and thanks to this marriage he became one of the major feudal lords of the Kingdom of Naples. In 1539 he bought the countship of Guastalla, on the left bank of the Po for 22,280 golden scudi from Countess Ludovica Torelli; this guaranteed him the rank of sovereign prince of the Holy Roman Empire, because the County of Guastalla enjoyed very broad autonomy and practically almost independence, despite its limited size. This acquisition was in part also a strategic purchase, for Guastalla lies near Ferrara, which Charles wished to take from the Este.

Ferrante's villa near Milan, La Gualtiera, is now known as La Simonetta. Ferrante rebuilt it in the 1550s, commissioning the services of the Tuscan architect Domenico Giuntallodi of Prato. Ferrante was a patron and protector of the sculptor and medallist Leone Leoni, who executed a bronze medal for him about 1555, with a reverse that depicts Hercules with upraised club besting the Nemean Lion and the legend TV NE CEDE MALIS, "You do not yield to evil", alluding to his acquittal after indictment for misappropriation of funds and corruption. His son Cesare commissioned from Leone a more public monument, a bronze Triumph of Ferrante Gonzaga over Envy, (1564), which stands in Piazza Roma, Guastalla. Like all the Gonzaga, Ferrante was a patron of tapestry-makers: a series of tapestries named Fructus Belli ("the Fruits of War") was woven for him in Brussels by Jan Baudoyn in 1544, and a lighter series of Putti.

Ferrante died in Brussels from a fall from his horse at the Battle of St. Quentin. He was buried in the sacristy of the Mantua Cathedral.

Ferrante was succeeded in Guastalla by his son Cesare.

He was the ambassador to Henry VIII of England in 1543.

== Marriage and issue ==
Ferrante and Isabella had:

- Anna (1531), died young;
- Cesare (1533–1575), count of Guastalla, married Camilla Borromeo, sister of Charles Borromeo
- Ippolita (1535–1563), married in 1549 with Fabrizio Colonna, hereditary prince of Paliano, and in 1554 with Antonio Carafa, duke of Mondragone
- Francesco (1538–1566), cardinal
- Andrea (1539–1586), 1st marquis of Specchia and Alessano;
- Gian Vincenzo (1540–1591), cardinal
- Ercole (1545–1549);
- Ottavio (1543–1583), Lord of Cercemaggiore; Captain General of the Spanish Cavalry in Italy;
- Filippo, died young;
- Geronima, died young;
- Maria, died young.

== Sources ==
- O'Leary, Jessica (2025). Renaissance Masculinities, Diplomacy, and Cultural Transfer: Federico and Ferrante Gonzaga in Italy and Beyond. ISBN 9781040781920.
- Parrott, David (1997). "A prince souverain and the French crown: Charles de Nevers, 1580-1637". In Oresko, Robert; Gibbs, G. C.; Scott, H. M. (eds.). Royal and Republican Sovereignty in Early Modern Europe: Essays in Memory of Ragnhild Hatton. Cambridge University Press.

Political offices
| Preceded by Ludovica Torelli | Count of Guastalla; 1539–1557 | Succeeded by Cesare I |
| Preceded by Duke of Monteleone | viceroy of Sicily; 1535–1546 | Succeeded by Juan de Vega |
| Preceded by Alfonso d'Avalos | Governor of the Duchy of Milan; 1546–1555 | Succeeded by Fernando Álvarez de Toledo |
