= Bertazzoni =

Italian home appliance manufacturer

Bertazzoni S.p.A.
- Company type: Private
- Industry: Home appliances
- Founded: 1882; 144 years ago in Guastalla, Italy
- Founder: Francesco Bertazzoni
- Headquarters: Guastalla, Italy
- Key people: Paolo Bertazzoni, CEO and president
- Website: bertazzoni.com

Bertazzoni S.p.A. is an Italian home appliance manufacturer based in Guastalla. Founded in 1882 by Francesco Bertazzoni, the company has since been led by five generations of the Bertazzoni family. The company originally produced wood-burning stoves, which were discontinued in the 1980s. It began producing gas stoves in 1956, adding electric stoves in 1975, and induction cooktops in 2005.

Bertazzoni's appliances are based on designs, and produced in colors, inspired by the automotive industry in Italy. Besides ovens and cooktops, the company also markets refrigerators, dishwashers, and a number of other kitchen appliances. The company markets its products in more than 60 countries including Australia, Canada, Italy, the Philippines, and the United States.

== History ==
Bertazzoni was founded by Francesco Bertazzoni in 1882 in Guastalla, Italy. The company has been led by successive generations of the Bertazzoni family with Francesco's son, Antonio Bertazzoni, succeeding him in the early 20th century, followed by Napoleone Bertazzoni. The company opened its first factory in 1909 with construction partly financed by Napoleone's wife, Angela Bonfanti, the daughter of an affluent cheesemaker in Novellera.

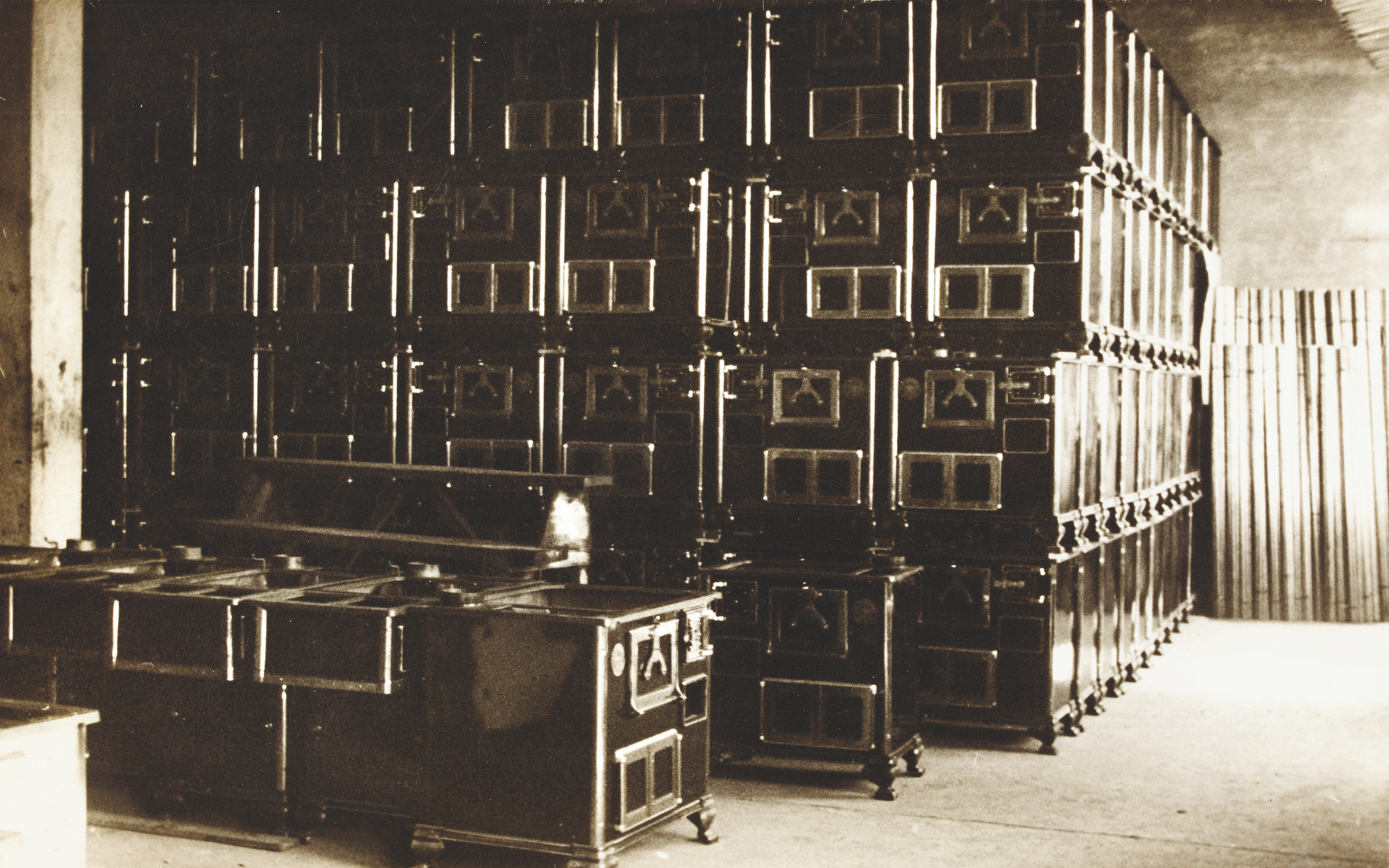
La Germania wood burning ovens in the 1930s

Napoleone had previously worked in the Turin automotive industry and introduced mass production to Bertazzoni in the 1920s. In 1923, the company adopted the Fratelli Bertazzoni brand name and logo. Three years later, Bertazzoni was accredited by the Reggio Emilia Chamber of Commerce and Industry. The company used the slogan "In Every Home" (Italian: "In Ogni Casa") to heavily promote its La Germania ovens during the interwar period.

Napoleone Bertazzoni died in 1939. After the Second World War, Bonfanti took out a loan to buy out the business from her in-laws and family to gain full ownership of the company with her two daughters and four sons. The youngest among them was Francesco Bertazzoni, who succeeded his mother in leading the company in the mid-1900s. This created a division in the family, leading to the formation of SMEG (still owned by the Bertazzoni family).

Bertazzoni introduced its first gas cooking ovens in 1956 but continued to produce wood burning stoves into the 1980s. The first electric oven was introduced in 1975, and induction cooktops in 2005.

Bertazzoni continues to operate as a family business. Paolo Bertazzoni began working for the company in 1981. He became the fifth-generation CEO and president of Bertazzoni in 1999. His sister Elisabetta is on the board of directors. Paolo's daughter Valentina and son Nicola also hold top-level positions in the company. Beginning in the early 2000s, the company adopted the Toyota Production System, whereby production level was dictated by actual demand in the market rather than available production capacity.

== Operations ==
Bertazzoni's manufacturing facilities remain in Guastalla where the company opened its main showroom, Casa Bertazzoni, in 2016. The company first began exporting its appliances to Manila, Philippines, in 1959–1960, and then licensed a manufacturer to produce Bertazzoni's La Germania appliances locally. Since then, three generations of a Filipino family have been in partnership with Bertazzoni to continue production under the license agreement. In the 1990s, Bertazzoni entered the Middle Eastern market with large ovens designed specifically for the cuisine of the region.

Bertazzoni began distributing its products in the United States in 2005. Some of its ovens were redesigned to increase their size to accommodate large turkeys traditionally served on Thanksgiving in the United States. By 2007, Bertazzoni products were sold in a total of more than 60 countries. By 2012, the U.S. was the single largest market for Bertazzoni appliances.

In 2011, Bertazzoni began featuring touch screen controls in its ovens which included software automated cooking modes. As of 2012, Bertazzoni ovens come in eight bright colors, including the two most popular colors: yellow and red inspired by luxury Italian sports cars.

Since 2015, Bertazzoni markets its appliances in a series of four design categories; the Professional Series are engineered toward a professional culinary industry standard with stainless steel throughout; the Master Series offers an industrial design for at-home use; the Modern Series has simple contemporary designs with glass and oxidized sheet metal; and the Heritage series offers a traditional decor style. In 2018, Bertazzoni's Professional Series was the winner of the Red Dot Design Award.

In 2019, Bertazzoni opened its first Australian showroom in South Melbourne. Bertazzoni appliances are also sold in Canada and the Philippines.

== Honours ==
In 2024, Nicola Bertazzoni, COO of Bertazzoni Group and CEO of Bertazzoni North America Inc., was appointed to the Board of Directors of the National Kitchen & Bath Association (NKBA). He is the first board member to be based outside North America.

In May 2024, Paolo Bertazzoni, CEO and President of Bertazzoni S.p.A., was awarded the title of Cavaliere del Lavoro (Knight of Labour) by the President of Italy, Sergio Mattarella.

In 2025, Paolo Bertazzoni was inducted into the Kitchen & Bath Industry Hall of Fame by the National Kitchen & Bath Association.

== See also ==
- List of Italian companies
