= Giuseppe Maria Gonzaga =

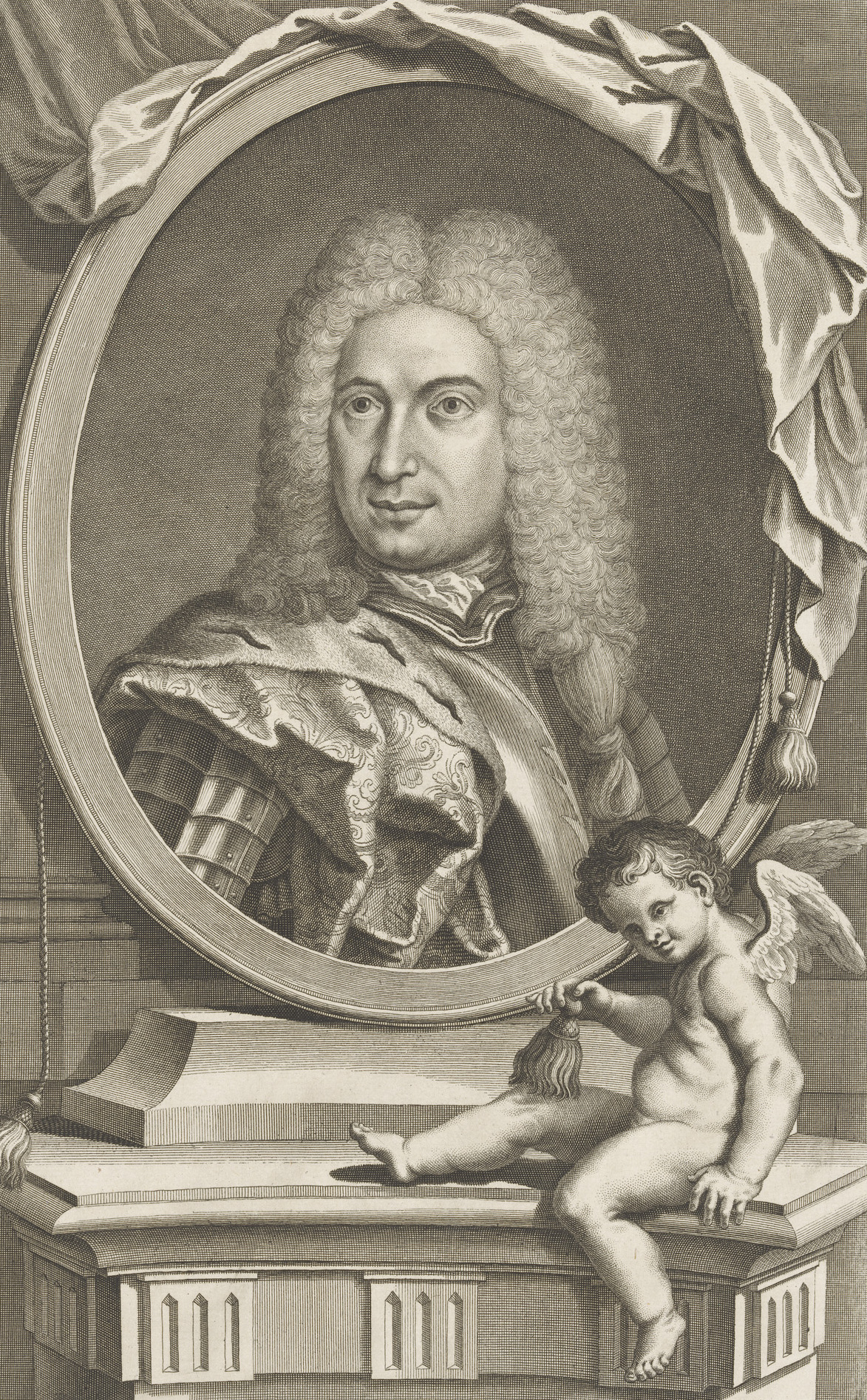
- Engraving of Giuseppe Gonzaga by Francesco Zucchi, 18th century

Duke of Guastalla
- Reign: 1 May 1729 – 16 August 1746
- Predecessor: Antonio Ferrante Gonzaga
- Successor: Philip of Bourbon
- Born: 20 March 1690; Guastalla, Duchy of Guastalla
- Died: 15 August 1746 (aged 56); Guastalla, Duchy of Bourbon
- Spouse: Eleonore von Schleswig-Holstein-Sonderburg-Wiesenburg
- House: Gonzaga
- Father: Vincenzo Gonzaga
- Mother: Maria Vittoria Gonzaga

Giuseppe Gonzaga (20 March 1690 – 16 August 1746) was the last reigning Duke of Guastalla and a member of the House of Gonzaga.

== Early life ==
Guiseppe was the second son of Vincenzo Gonzaga, Duke of Guastalla and his second wife, Princess Maria Vittoria Gonzaga of Guastalla (1659-1707). Giuseppe was mentally unstable, and his condition deteriorated over time.

When his elder brother Duke Antonio Ferrante died in an accident in 1729, Giuseppe was the only remaining male member of the Gonzaga family, so he became duke.

== Marriage ==
Giuseppe would probably never have married, but when he became duke a marriage was arranged in 1731 with the sixteen-year-old Princess Eleonore von Schleswig-Holstein-Sonderburg-Wiesenburg (1715–1760), daughter of Leopold, Duke of Schleswig-Holstein-Sonderburg-Wiesenburg and his wife, Princess Maria Elisabeth of Liechtenstein (1683-1744). She was also granddaughter of Duchess Karolina of Legnica-Brieg. The marriage remained childless.

== Duchy ==
During the War of Polish Succession the Duchy was occupied by the French for four years, between 1734 and 1738. When Giuseppe Gonzaga died in 1746, Italy was again a theater of war in the War of Austrian Succession, and the Duchy was annexed by Austria. Two years later, in the Treaty of Aix-La-Chapelle, Guastalla was ceded to the Spanish, together with the Duchy of Parma and Piacenza, with which it was merged.

== Bibliography ==
- Tamalio, Raffaele (2001). "GONZAGA, Giuseppe Maria". Dizionario Biografico degli Italiani (in Italian). Vol. 57: Giulini–Gonzaga. Rome: Istituto dell'Enciclopedia Italiana. ISBN 978-88-12-00032-6.

Preceded by Antonio Ferrante	Duke of Guastalla; 1729–1746	Succeeded by To Austria and then finally to the Duchy of Parma (1748)
