= Vincenzo Gonzaga, Duke of Guastalla =

Italian noble (1634–1714)

Vincenzo Gonzaga
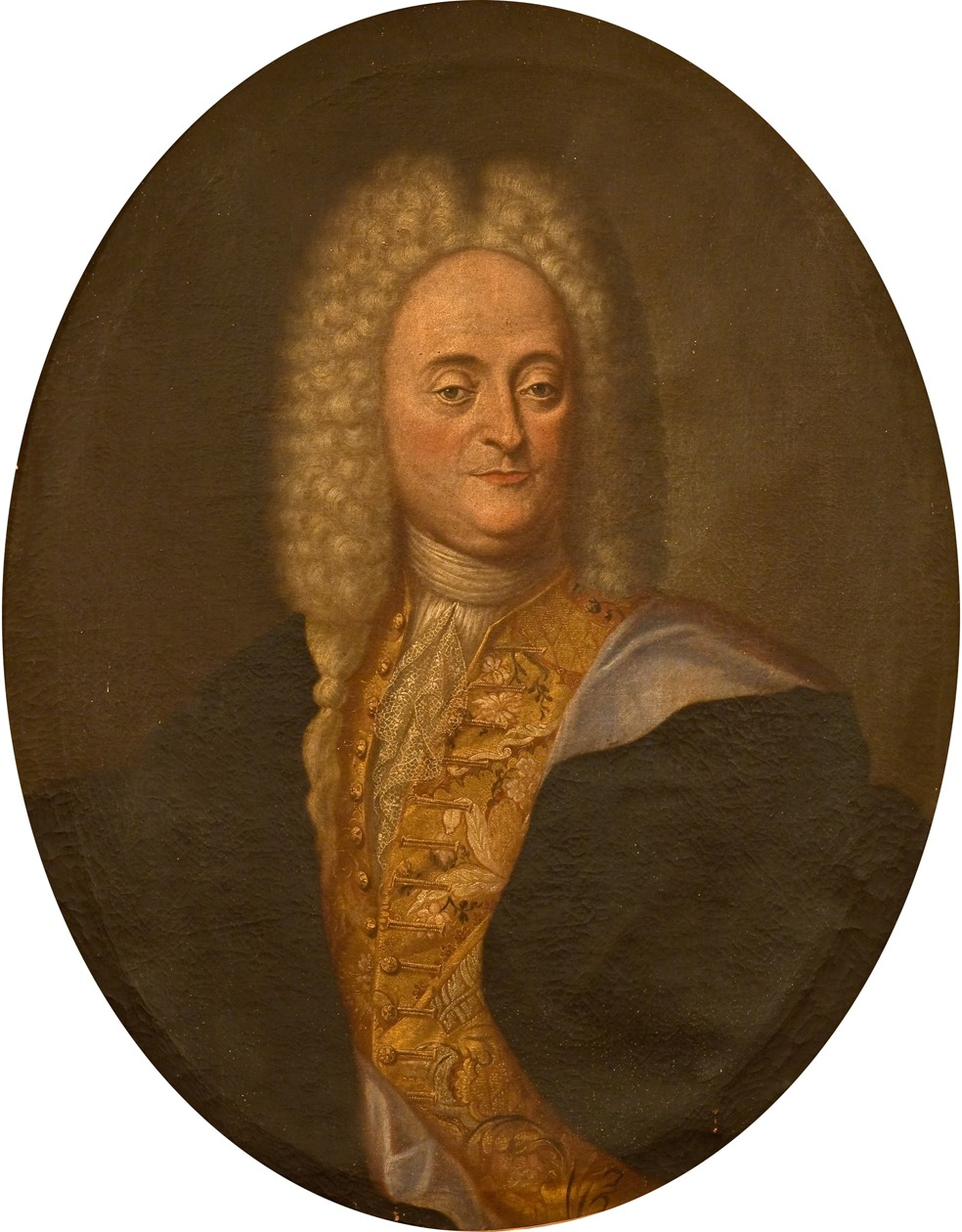
- Predecessor: Ferdinando Carlo
- Successor: Antonio Ferrante
- Born: 1634
- Died: 28 April 1714 (aged 79–80)
- Noble family: House of Gonzaga
- Spouse: Maria Vittoria Gonzaga
- Issue: Eleonora Luisa; Antonio Ferrante; Giuseppe Maria; Marie-Isabelle
- Father: Andrea Gonzaga

Vincenzo Gonzaga (1634 – 28 April 1714) was the reigning Duke of Guastalla and by birth member of the House of Gonzaga.

== Early life ==
Vincenzo was born as the second son of Andrea Gonzaga, Count of San Paolo (d. 1686) and his wife, Laura Crispano dei marchesi di Fusara. He was also paternal grandson of Ferrante II Gonzaga, Duke of Guastalla his wife, Donna Vittoria Doria, daughter of Giovanni Andrea Doria, 8th Prince of Melfi.

== Heir of the Duchy of Guastalla ==
When Duke Ferrante III of Guastalla died in 1678 without a male heir, Guastalla was ruled by Ferdinando Carlo, Duke of Mantua, who had married Princess Anna Isabella Gonzaga, Duke Ferrante III's oldest daughter. In 1692, the reigning Duke of Guastalla was accused of felony, and Emperor Leopold I gave Guastalla and its territories to Vincenzo Gonzaga, who became the new Duke of Guastalla.

== Marriages and issue ==
Vincenzo married firstly to Donna Porzia Guidi di Bagno (d. 1672), who was also his first cousin as daughter of Nicola Marquis of Bagno and Montebello by his aunt, Princess Teodora Gonzaga of Guastalla.

After the death of his first wife, Vincenzo married to another relative, Princess Maria Vittoria Gonzaga di Guastalla (1659–1707), the youngest daughter of his cousin, Duke Ferrante III Gonzaga of Guastalla (1618-1678) and his wife, Princess Margherita d’Este of Modena (1619-1692).

The marriage was supported by Spain and was arranged as an effort to depose Ferdinando Carlo Gonzaga, his sister-in-law’s husband. Ferdinando Carlo had with the support of Emperor Leopold taken control over Mantua after Maria Vittoria's father's death. Through Vincenzos being a close relative of Ferrante and through his marriage to an heir Maria Vittoria, her new husband would have a stronger claim on Mantua and Spain would gain an important ally once Vincenzo became the new duke of Mantua.

The couple were married in September, 1679 and Vincenzo proclaimed himself Duke of Guastalla. Mantua protested, after which Spain intervened and threatened Mantua. In 1691, Spain attacked Mantua, and Ferdinando Carlo fled to Venice with his ministers. Mantua defended itself against Spain and Vincenzo was forced to give up his claim.

Maria Vittoria had been rejected as a bride for the widowed Emperor Leopold, because she was thought to be "delicate" to be able give birth to any children. Nevertheless Vincenzo and Maria Vittoria would go on to have three children.

== Issue ==
- Eleonora Luisa Gonzaga (1686–1742), married in 1709 Francesco Maria de' Medici
- Antonio Ferrante Gonzaga (1687–1729), next Duke of Guastalla from 1704, married 1) Margherita Cesarini, and 2) Princess Theodora of Hesse-Darmstadt
- Giuseppe Gonzaga (1690–1746), next Duke of Guastalla from 1729, married Princess Eleonore von Schleswig-Holstein-Sonderburg-Wiesenburg .

Vincenzo Gonzaga inherited in 1707 Bozzolo and Pomponesco, and in 1710 Sabbioneta.

== Relatives ==
- His uncle was also called Vincenzo (1602–1694) and was Viceroy of Valencia in 1663, Viceroy of Catalonia between 1664 and 1667 and Viceroy of Sicily in 1678.
- His cousin, Vespasiano-Vincenzo (1621–1687) was Viceroy of Valencia in 1669.

== Sources ==
- Parrott, David (1997). "A prince souverain and the French crown:Charles de Nevers, 1580-1637". In Oresko, Robert; Gibbs, G. C.; Scott, H. M. (eds.). Royal and Republican Sovereignty in Early Modern Europe. Cambridge University Press. pp. 149–187.

Preceded by Under the Duchy of Milan; Predecessor as Duke: Ferrante III Gonzaga, Duke of Guastalla	Duke of Guastalla; 1692–1714	Succeeded by Antonio Ferrante
