= Diana di Cordona =

16th-century Italian noblewoman

Diana di Cordona (1499 – after 1550) was an Italian noble and courtier. She was the lady-in-waiting to queen Bona of Poland and mistress of Sigismund II Augustus and Cesare I Gonzaga, who later in life went missing and was presumed to be dead in 1550.
