= Cesare I Gonzaga =

- Duke of Guastalla
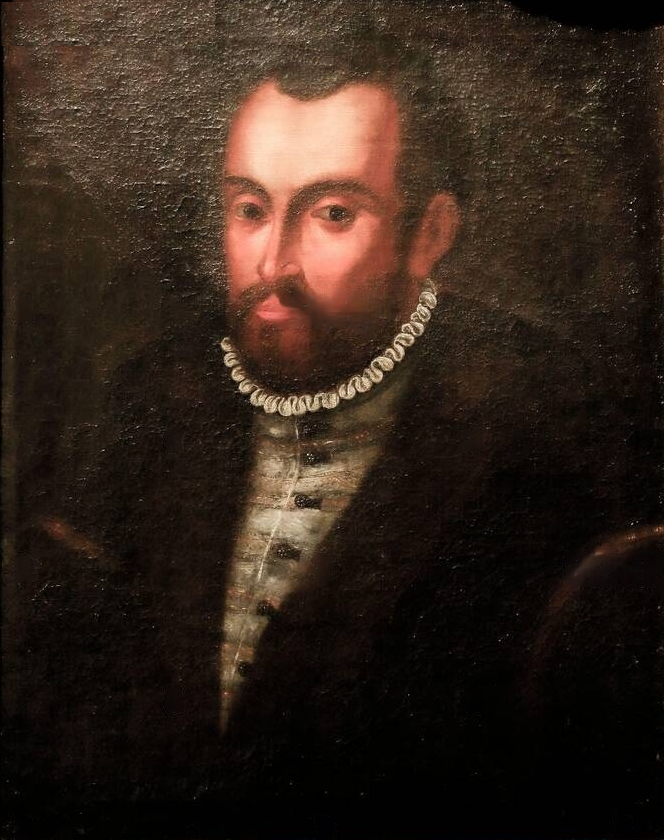
- Predecessor: Ferrante Gonzaga
- Successor: Ferrante II Gonzaga
- Born: 1530
- Died: 15 February 1575 (aged 44–45)
- Spouse: Camilla Borromeo
- Issue: Ferrante II Gonzaga; Margherita
- Father: Ferrante Gonzaga
- Mother: Isabella di Capua

Cesare I Gonzaga (1530 – 15 February 1575) was count of Guastalla from 1557 until his death. He was a member of the House of Gonzaga, the first-born son of the imperial condottiero Ferrante Gonzaga and Isabella du Capua. From the latter, he inherited also the title of Count of Amalfi. He was also Duke of Ariano and Prince of Molfetta. On 21 May 1558 he was appointed commander-in-chief of the troops in Lombardy by Philip II. On 12 March 1560 he married Camilla Borromeo (1536-1583), sister of Charles Borromeo and niece of Giovanni Angelo de' Medici, who had recently been elected Pope with the name of Pius IV.

Cesare Gonzaga was a member of the Academy of the Vatican Nights, which met in the Casina Pio IV in the Vatican. In November 1562, he founded the Accademia degli Invaghiti in Mantua, in the palace he inherited from his father.

In 1567–68 he moved his court from Mantua to Guastalla, where he remained until his death, employing Francesco da Volterra as his architect and engineer.

His mistress was Diana di Cordona.

== Marriage and issue ==
Cesare and Camilla had:

- Ferrante succeeded him in Guastalla.
- Margherita m. Vespansiano Gonzaga

== Sources ==
- Fenlon, Iain (2008). Music and Patronage in Sixteenth-Century Mantua. Vol. 1. Cambridge University Press. ISBN 9780521088336.
- Furlotti, Barbara (2019). Antiquities in Motion: From Excavation Sites to Renaissance Collections. Getty Research Institute. ISBN 9781606065914.
- Parrott, David (1997). "A prince souverain and the French crown: Charles de Nevers, 1580-1637". In Oresko, Robert; Gibbs, G. C.; Scott, H. M. (eds.). Royal and Republican Sovereignty in Early Modern Europe: Essays in Memory of Ragnhild Hatton. Cambridge University Press. ISBN 9780521419109.
- Schwindt, Joel (2022). Orpheus in the Academy: Monteverdi's First Opera and the Accademia degli Invaghiti. Routledge. ISBN 9781000431339.

Preceded by Ferrante I	Count of Guastalla; 1557–1575	Succeeded by Ferrante II
