= List of rulers of Guastalla =

Coat of arms of the Gonzaga family as Dukes of Guastalla.

This is a list of rulers of Guastalla, a town in Emilia-Romagna, Italy, on the right bank of the Po River. The County of Guastalla was established in 1406 for the Torelli family. In 1456, the county was partitioned, with Montechiarugolo and Casei going to Pietro Guido I Torelli.

The County of Guastalla was raised to ducal status in 1621, when it became the Duchy of Guastalla.

== Lords of Guastalla ==
- Gilberto da Correggio 1307-1321
- Simone da Correggio 1321-1346, together with:
  - Guido da Correggio
  - Azzone da Correggio
  - Giovanni da Correggio
- To the Duchy of Milan 1346-1403
- Ottone Terzi 1403-1406

== Counts of Guastalla ==
- Guido Torelli 1406-1449 (Count from 1428)
- Cristoforo Torelli 1449-1490
- Guido Galeotto Torelli 1460-1479, together with:
  - Francesco Maria Torelli
- Pietro Guido II Torelli 1486-1494
- Achille Torelli 1494-1522
- Ludovica Torelli 1522-1539
- Ferrante I Gonzaga 1539-1557
- Cesare I Gonzaga 1557-1575
- Ferrante II Gonzaga 1575-1630 (Count until 1621, then Duke)

== Dukes of Guastalla ==
- Ferrante II Gonzaga 1575-1630 (Count before 1621)
- Cesare II Gonzaga 1630-1632
- Ferrante III Gonzaga 1632-1678
- To the Duchy of Milan 1678-1693
  - Ferdinando Carlo Gonzaga 1678-1693
- Vincenzo Gonzaga 1693-1714
  - To France 1702-1704
- Antonio Ferdinando Gonzaga 1714-1729
- Giuseppe Maria Gonzaga 1729-1746
  - To France 1734-1738
- To the Holy Roman Empire (1746–1748)
- To the Duchy of Parma, Piacenza e Guastalla (1748–1806; under French occupation from 1801)
  - Philip 1748-1765
  - Ferdinand I 1765-1802
- Pauline Bonaparte (March–August 1806), together with:
  - Camillo Borghese
- To the Kingdom of Italy (1806-1814)
- To the restored Duchy of Parma, Piacenza e Guastalla (1814–1847)
  - Marie Louise 1814-1847
- To the Duchy of Modena (1847–1861)
  - Francis V 1847-1859
- Part of Italy (1861–present)
