= Smeg (appliances) =

Italian domestic appliance manufacturer

Smeg Group S.p.A.

- Smeg concept store in SM Mall of Asia, Pasay, Philippines
- Type: Private
- Industry: Home appliances
- Founded: 1948; 78 years ago in Guastalla, Italy
- Founder: Vittorio Bertazzoni
- Headquarters: Guastalla, Italy
- Area served: Worldwide
- Key people: Vittorio Bertazzoni, Roberto Bertazzoni, Vittorio Bertazzoni current Chairman
- Brands: Smeg, La Pavoni
- Revenue: €906 million (2021)
- Number of employees: 2,600 (2021)
- Website: www.smeg.com

Smeg (Italian: Smalterie Metallurgiche Emiliane Guastalla, lit. 'Emilian Guastalla Metallurgical Enamelling Works') is an Italian upmarket home appliance manufacturer.

== History ==
Founded in 1948 by Vittorio Bertazzoni as an enamelling and metalworking company, the company preserves the memory of its original purpose and location (Guastalla, Reggio Emilia) in the name acronymised as Smeg, Smalterie Metallurgiche Emiliane Guastalla ("Emilian Metallurgical Enamelling Works Guastalla").

During the 1950s, the company’s metalworking background was accompanied by the production of its first cooking appliances. In 1955, the company presented "Elizabeth", one of the first gas stoves equipped with automatic ignition, a safety valve in the oven and a cooking programmer.

In the 1960s, Smeg introduced its first washing machine, the Leda, and then the large 60 cm Niagara dishwasher, with capacity for 14 place settings.

In 1971, the company began production of built-in hobs and ovens.

In 2019, Smeg acquired the Italian espresso machine manufacturer La Pavoni, which continues to operate as part of the Smeg Group.

== Other activities ==
Smeg started in the residential sector, and later entered the commercial market. Smeg Foodservice manufactures appliances for the hotel, restaurant and catering market, and Smeg Instruments supplies disinfection equipment to hospitals and dental surgeries.

== Business ==
The design and manufacture of Smeg appliances is concentrated in four factories located in Northern Italy, each specialising in a specific type of appliance. Smeg has subsidiaries worldwide, overseas offices and an extensive sales network. Smeg has developed products in collaboration with architects and designers including Guido Canali (who also designed the company headquarters in Guastalla), Mario Bellini, Renzo Piano, Marc Newson and deepdesign.

Production takes place in six plants in Italy and China (Guastalla, Milan, Turin, Chieti, Bonferraro and Shenzhen). The subsidiary SMEG Deutschland GmbH is active in Germany. SMEG is represented worldwide with 17 branches, in the United Kingdom, France, Belgium, the Netherlands, Germany, Sweden, Denmark, Spain, Portugal, Russia, Ukraine, Kazakhstan, South Africa, the USA, Australia, Mexico, and Mozambique, as well as two representative offices in Hong Kong and Saudi Arabia.

== FAB 1950s-style appliances ==
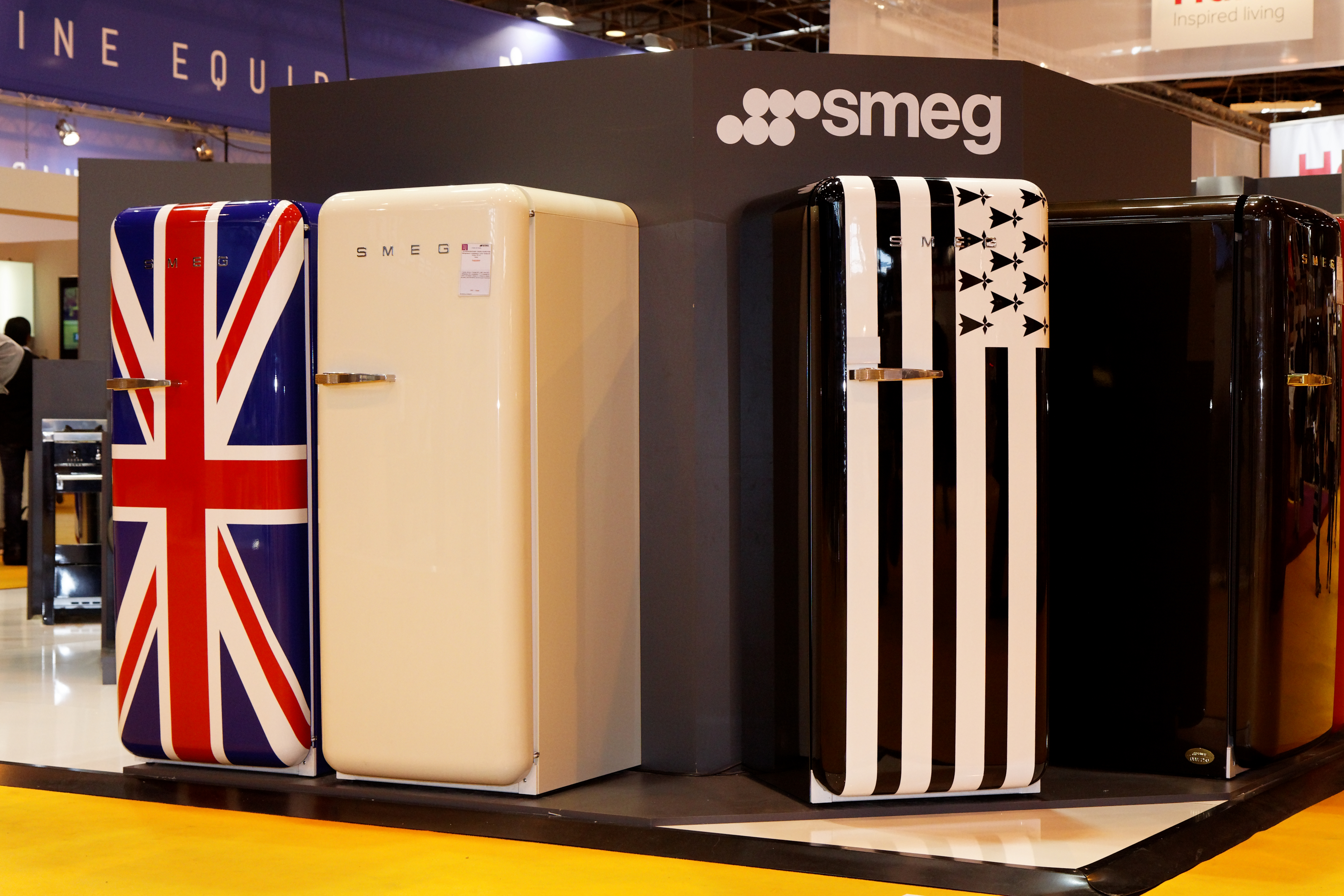
Smeg refrigerators with a retro style, 2011

In 1997, Smeg introduced refrigerators styled similarly to 1950s models. The refrigerators were available in several colours, with model names prefixed "FAB", and bearing the distinctive SMEG logo. The FAB line remained in production, with technically modern appliances with 1950s appearance. The FAB28 had deep curved doors and a large handle. Fridge-freezers were later introduced, with more colour options, and special editions, such as a Union Jack door. In 2014, small domestic appliances, such as toasters and kettles, were added to the FAB 50s range.

== Awards ==
- 2010: Good Design Award granted by the Chicago Athenaeum, Museum of Architecture and Design and the European Centre for Architecture, Art, Design and Urban Studies, for the FP610SG oven and the P755SBL hob from the innovative Newson product line.

== See also ==
- List of Italian companies
