= County of Montechiarugolo =

Italian polity

The County of Montechiarugolo was a small sovereign state of northern Italy which existed from 1456 to 1612. It included the other fief of Casei.

It was created from a splitting in the county of Guastalla between count Cristoforo Torelli and Pietro Guido I Torelli, first count of Montechiarugolo. The title was held by the Torelli family in his whole history, until in 1612 it was annexed by Ranuccio I Farnese, Duke of Parma following the beheading of Pio Torelli, his sister Clelia Torelli, and her husband for their involvement Congiura dei feudatari against Farnese.

== Counts of Montechiarugolo ==
- Pomponio Torelli (1539-1608)
- Pio Torelli (fl. 1608-1612)
