= Cesare II Gonzaga =

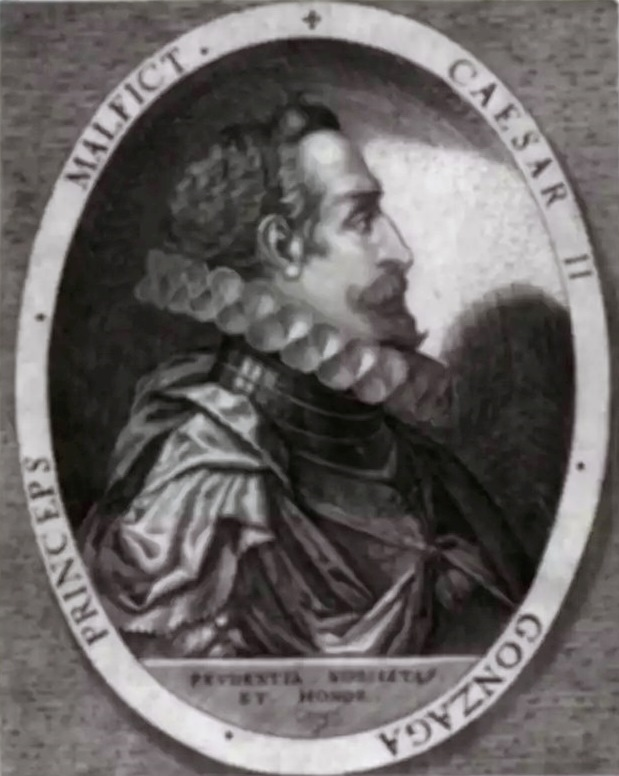
- Predecessor: Ferrante II Gonzaga
- Successor: Ferrante III Gonzaga
- Born: Mantua, Duchy of Mantua
- Died: 26 February 1632
- Noble family: House of Gonzaga
- Spouse: Isabella Orsini
- Issue: Ferrante III Gonzaga; Vespasiano Vincenzo Gonzaga
- Father: Ferrante II Gonzaga
- Mother: Vittoria Doria

Cesare II Gonzaga (Mantua, 1592 – 26 February 1632) was Duke of Guastalla.

He was the son of Ferrante II Gonzaga, Duke of Guastalla and Duke of Amalfi and of Vittoria Doria.
He succeeded his father in 1630, but died 2 years later.

From 1630 to 1632 he was General Commissar in Italy for Ferdinand II.

== Marriage & issue ==
Cesar married in 1612 with Isabella Orsini (1598–1623), and had:

- Ferrante III Gonzaga (1618–1678), next Duke of Guastalla.
- Vespasiano Vincenzo Gonzaga, (1621–1687), Viceroy of Valencia, married María Inés Manrique de Lara, daughter and heiress of Manuel 9th Count of Prades de Nava

== Sources ==
- Parrott, David (1997). "A prince souverain and the French crown: Charles de Nevers, 1580-1637". In Oresko, Robert; Gibbs, G. C.; Scott, H. M. (eds.). Royal and Republican Sovereignty in Early Modern Europe: Essays in Memory of Ragnhild Hatton. Cambridge University Press.
- Runschke, Florian (2019). "Das Generalkommissariat in Italien von 1624-1632. Auftrag, Arbeit und Akzeptanz der ersten beiden Amtsinhaber". Quellen und Forschungen aus italienischen Archiven und Bibliotheken (in German). 99: 201–242.

Preceded by Ferrante II	Duke of Guastalla; 1630–1632	Succeeded by Ferrante III
