= Francesco Maria de' Medici =

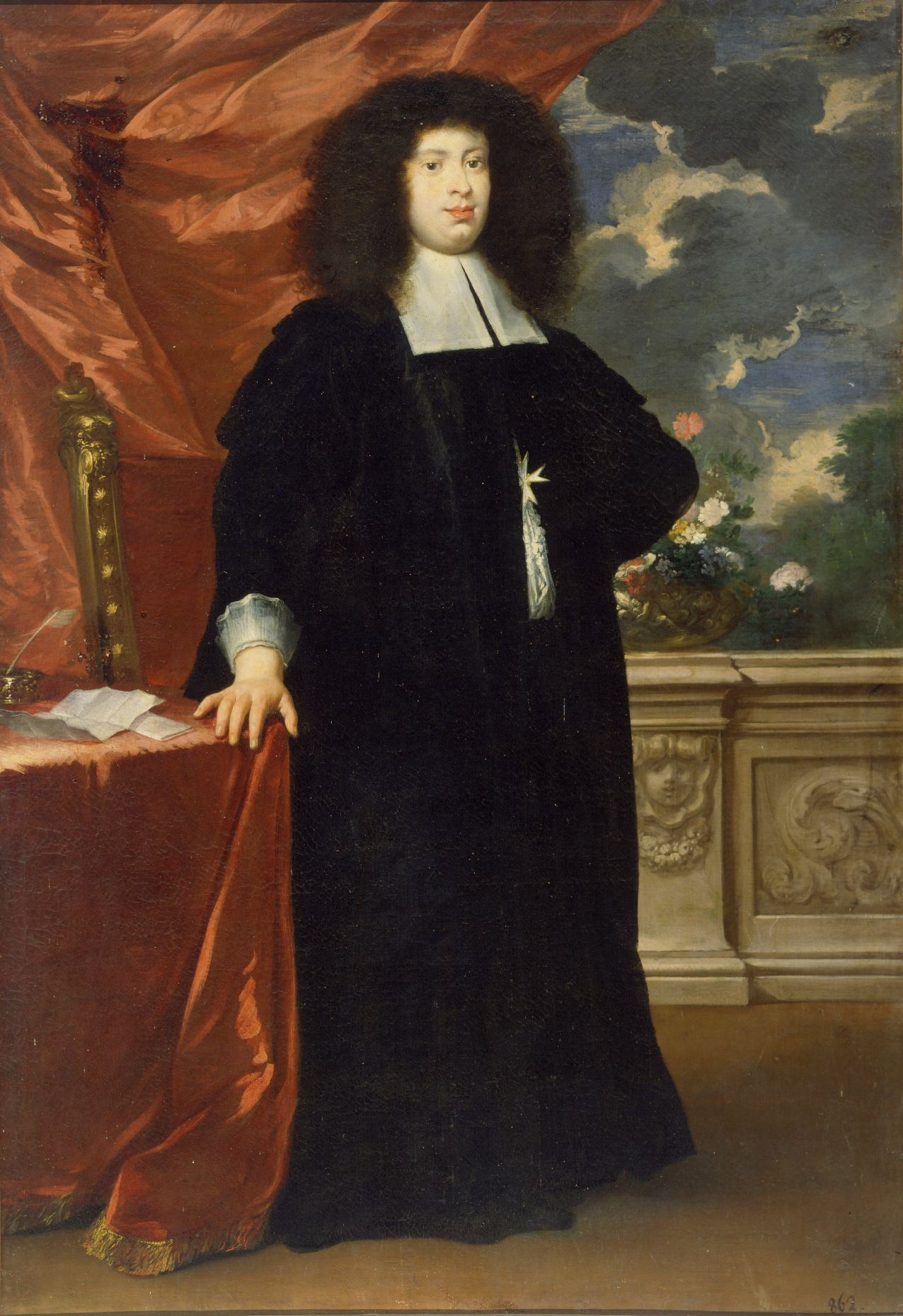
- Portrait by Justus Sustermans, 1678

Duke of Montefeltro
- Reign: 6 March 1694 – 3 February 1711
- Born: 12 November 1660; Pitti Palace, Florence, Tuscany
- Died: 3 February 1711 (aged 50); Bagno a Ripoli, Florence, Tuscany
- Spouse: Eleonora Luisa Gonzaga
Names
- Francesco Maria de' Medici
- House: House of Medici
- Father: Ferdinando II de' Medici
- Mother: Vittoria della Rovere

Francesco Maria de' Medici (12 November 1660 – 3 February 1711) was a member of the House of Medici. He was successively a Governor of Siena, and later the heir of the duchy of Montefeltro by right of his mother. He was also a cardinal of the Catholic Church from the years of 1660 until 1709, participating in the papal conclaves of 1689, 1691, and 1700.

== Biography ==
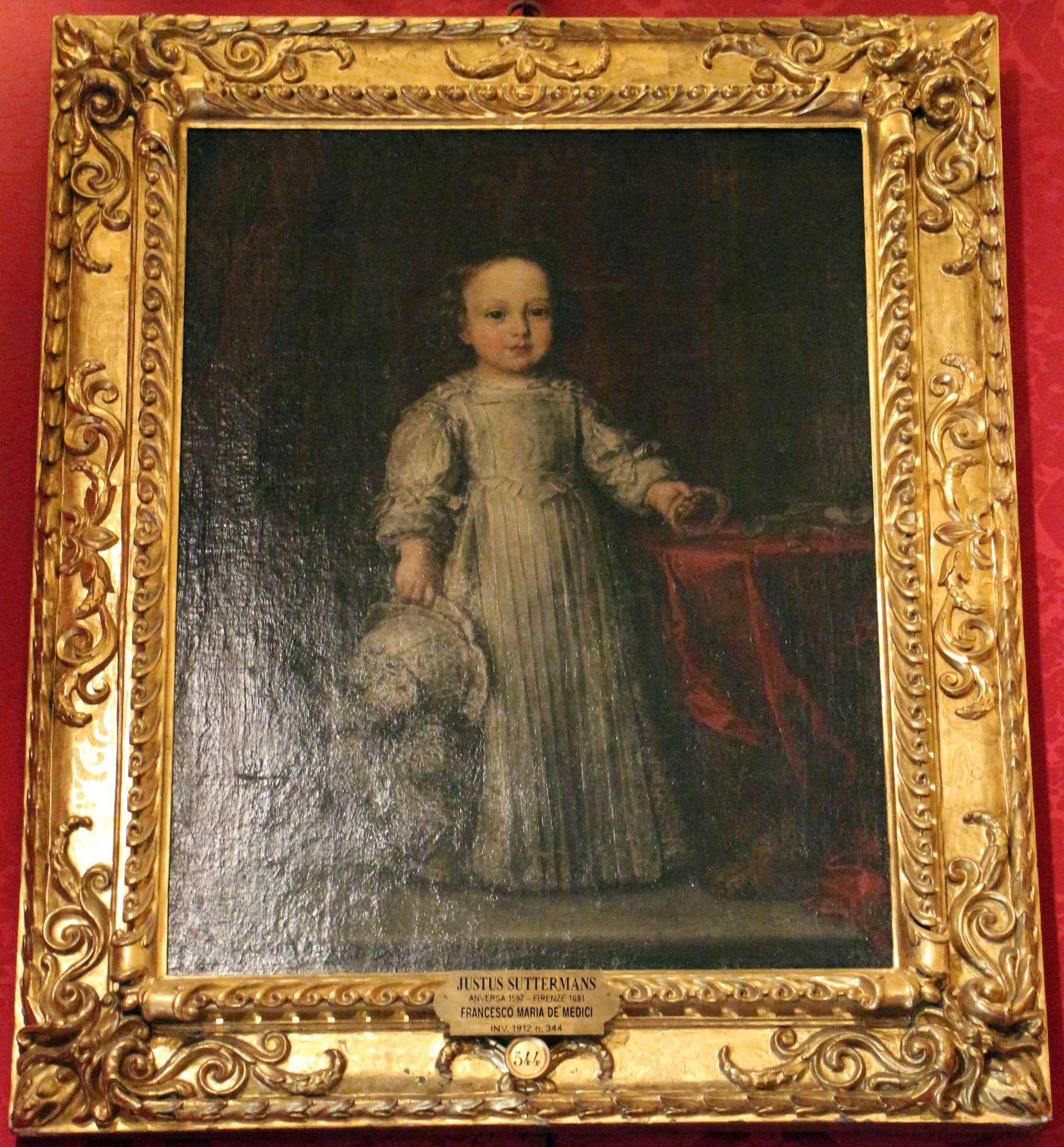
Francesco Maria de' Medici as an infant

Medici was born in Florence in 1660 and was the second son of Ferdinando II de' Medici, Grand Duke of Tuscany and his wife Vittoria della Rovere. He was the product of a reconciliation between his parents after his mother found the Grand Duke of Tuscany in bed with one of his pages. He was the younger brother of Cosimo III de' Medici, who was eighteen years older. Celebrations of his birth continued until the fifteenth, when he was baptized in the private chapel of the Pitti Palace.

In early childhood, nearly the same age as his brother Cosimo's children, they shared the same wet nurses and governesses. He received a broad education composed of mathematical and physical sciences, history, geography and literature.

In 1683, he was appointed to governor of Siena, a position he maintained until his death. Three years later, in September 1686, he was created cardinal with the permission of Pope Innocent XI. Francesco Maria exerted a notable influence in the conclaves of 1689 and 1700. Despite having this influence with the Papal States, he lived mainly at Villa di Lappeggi outside Florence. In his tenancy of the villa, Lappeggi was restored and became known as the seat of his personal court where various parties and much revelry took place.

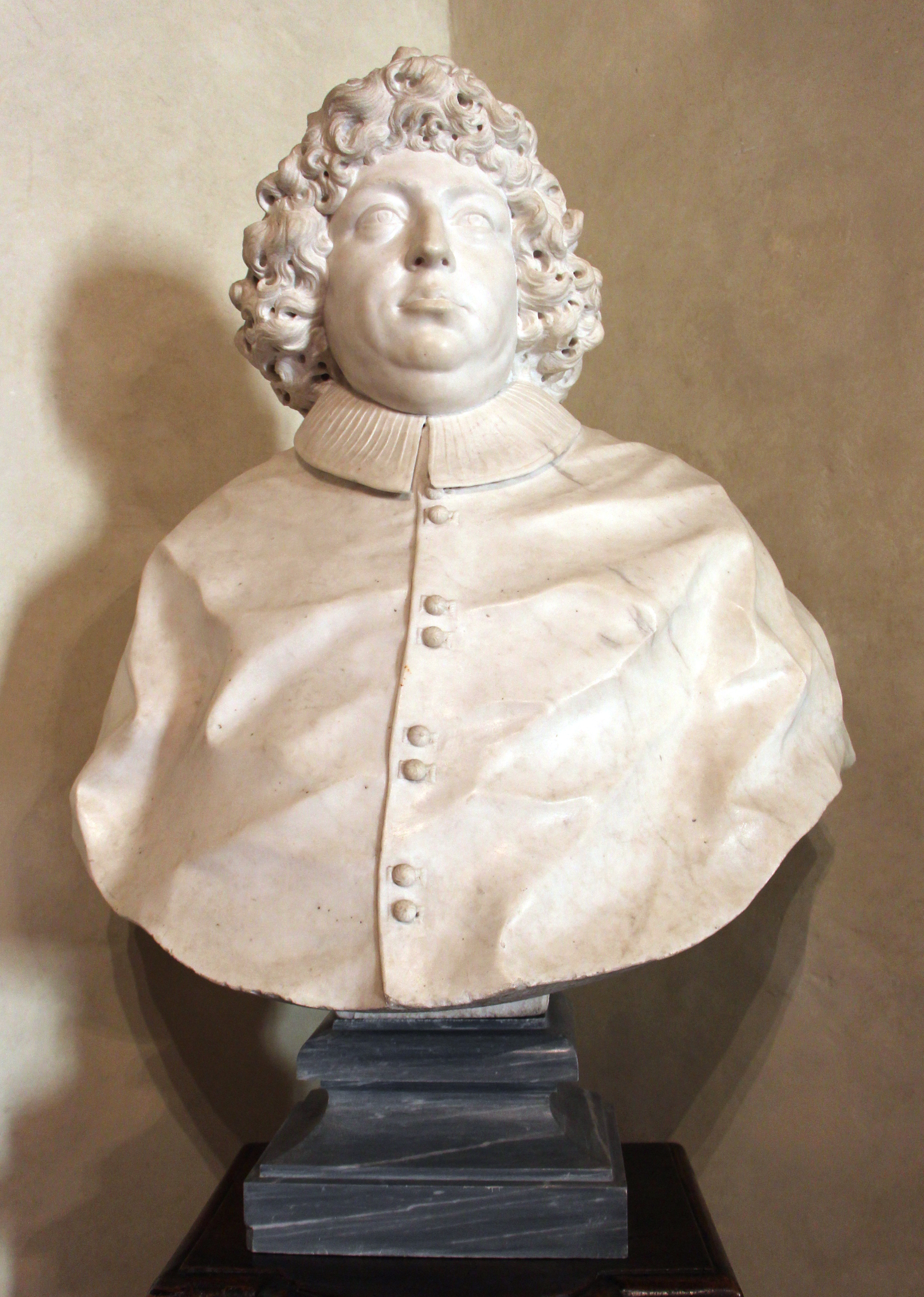
1686 bust of cardinal Francesco Maria by Giovanni Battista Foggini

At the death of his mother in March 1694, Medici succeeded to the Duchies of Rovere and Montefeltro, her allodial possessions, once the possession of the House of La Rovere. He acted as mentor to his nephew Grand Prince of Tuscany, heir to the Tuscan throne. When it became clear that the Grand Prince and his wife Violante Beatrice of Bavaria were not going to produce an heir, Cosimo III looked towards his brother to solve the problem facing the Tuscan succession. The question of an heir was further exacerbated when the union between Prince Gian Gastone and Anna Maria of Saxe-Lauenburg also remained barren.

In 1709, when his health had already deteriorated, he obtained the Papal dispensation from the cardinalate, and was forced to marry Eleonora Luisa Gonzaga, daughter of Vincenzo Gonzaga, Duke of Guastalla, in an attempt to save the dynasty. Married by proxy on 16 June 1709, the couple were married in person on 14 July 1709.

Contemporaries agreed that Gonzaga was an attractive woman with beautiful skin, eyes, mouth, and waist. However, it was soon clear that the marriage was not to be a fruitful union. Gonzaga was repulsed by her husband, refusing to fulfil her marital duties with a man twenty-six years her senior. Despite requisitioning the assistance of her old confessor from Guastalla, Cosimo III could not cajole her into submitting, as she allegedly feared contracting venereal diseases. Medici had her surmount this predicament and eventually the marriage was consummated. However, no heirs were born leaving Francesco Maria devastated.

Medici retired to Bagno a Ripoli where he died in 1711 from dropsy, leaving behind exorbitant debts.

== Ancestry ==
Ancestors of Francesco Maria de' Medici

8. Ferdinando I de' Medici, Grand Duke of Tuscany
4. Cosimo II de' Medici, Grand Duke of Tuscany
9. Christina of Lorraine
2. Ferdinando II de' Medici, Grand Duke of Tuscany
10. Charles II of Austria
5. Maria Magdalena of Austria
11. Maria Anna of Bavaria
1. Francesco Maria de' Medici
12. Francesco Maria II della Rovere
6. Federico Ubaldo della Rovere, Duke of Urbino
13. Livia della Rovere
3. Vittoria della Rovere
14. Ferdinando I de' Medici, Grand Duke of Tuscany (= 8)
7. Claudia de' Medici
15. Christina of Lorraine (= 9)

== Bibliography ==
- Acton, Harold: The Last Medici, Macmillan, London, 1980, ISBN 0-333-29315-0
- Moroni, Gaetano: Dizionario di Erudizione Storico Ecclesiastica da San Pietro, Tipografia Emiliana, 1847
