= Ferrante III Gonzaga =

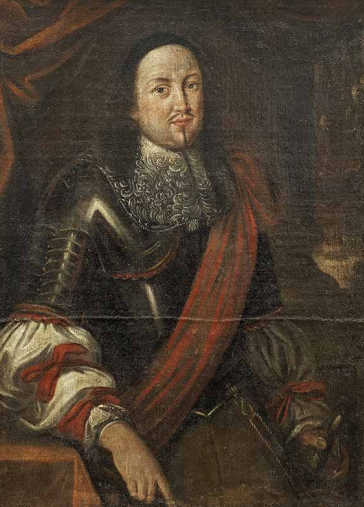
- Predecessor: Cesare II Gonzaga
- Successor: Ferdinando Carlo Gonzaga
- Born: 4 April 1618
- Died: 11 January 1678 (aged 59)
- Noble family: House of Gonzaga
- Spouse: Margherita d'Este
- Issue: Isabella; Rinaldo; Cesare; Anna Isabella Gonzaga; Maria Vittoria Gonzaga; Vincenzo
- Father: Cesare II Gonzaga
- Mother: Isabella Orsini

Ferrante III Gonzaga (4 April 1618 – 11 January 1678), was a Duke of Guastalla. He was the son of Cesare II Gonzaga, Duke of Guastalla and Duke of Amalfi and Isabella Orsini.

== Life ==
Ferrante succeeded his father in 1632 as Duke of Guastalla. In 1638 he sold all the minor Neapolitan fiefs and in 1640 also sold the Principality of Molfetta.

When Ferrante died without surviving male heirs, the Duchy of Guastalla became officially a part of the Duchy of Milan. It was ruled by his daughter Anna's husband, Ferdinando Carlo of Mantua from 1678 to 1692. Due to Austrian intervention, the Duchy then passed to his daughter Maria's husband, Vincenzo Gonzaga.

== Marriage and issue ==
On 25 June 1647, Ferrante married Princess Margherita d'Este (1619-1692), daughter of Duke Alfonso III d'Este of Modena. They had:

- Isabella (d. 1653).
- Rinaldo (1652 – 9 October 1657).
- Cesare (1653–1666).
- Anna Isabella (12 February 1655 – 18 August 1703), married in 1670 Ferdinando Carlo Gonzaga (1652–1708), Duke of Mantua and Monferrato.
- Maria Vittoria Gonzaga (9 September 1659 – 5 September 1707), married in 1679 her cousin Vincenzo Gonzaga.
- Vincenzo (d. 1665/66).

== Sources ==
- Parrott, David (1997). "A prince souverain and the French crown: Charles de Nevers, 1580-1637". In Oresko, Robert; Gibbs, G. C.; Scott, H. M. (eds.). Royal and Republican Sovereignty in Early Modern Europe: Essays in Memory of Ragnhild Hatton. Cambridge University Press.

Preceded by Cesare II	Duke of Guastalla; 1632–1678	Succeeded by Under the Duchy of Milan; Successor as Duke: Vincenzo Gonzaga, Duke of Guastalla
