= Ferrante II Gonzaga =

- Duke of Guastalla
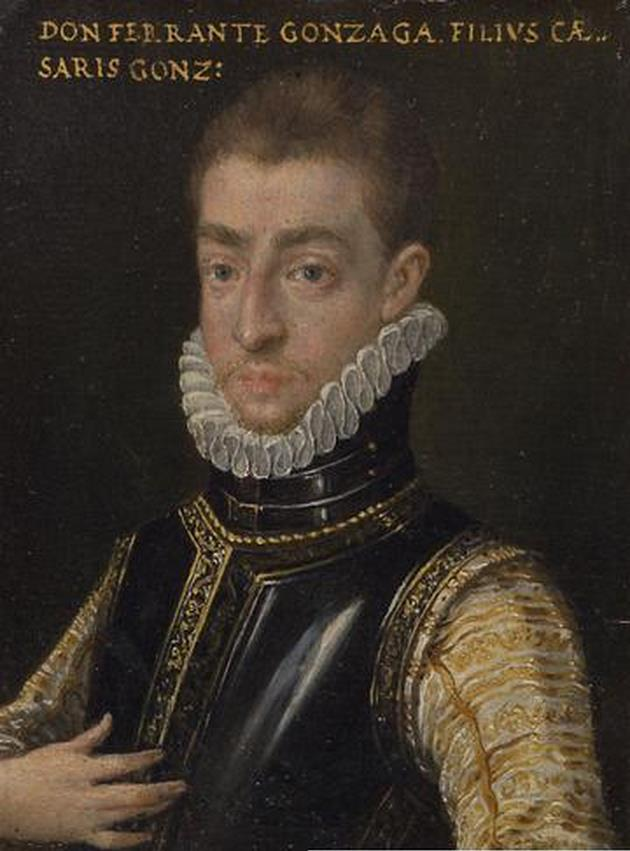
- Predecessor: Cesare I Gonzaga
- Successor: Cesare II Gonzaga
- Born: 1563
- Died: 6 August 1639 (aged 75–76)
- Noble family: House of Gonzaga
- Issue: Cesare II Gonzaga; Vicente de Gonzaga y Doria; Andrea Gonzaga; Zenobia
- Father: Cesare I Gonzaga
- Mother: Camilla Borromeo

Ferrante II Gonzaga (1563 – 6 August 1630) was count and, from 1621, duke of Guastalla.

He was the son of Cesare I Gonzaga, count of Guastalla and duke of Amalfi, and Donna Camilla Borromeo. He succeeded his father in 1575. On 2 July 1621, the County of Guastalla was elevated to a duchy and Ferrante was subsequently deemed a duke.

In 1624 Emperor Ferdinand II appointed Ferrante as general commissar in Italy to reinforce imperial authority.

Ferrante played a part in the War of the Mantuan Succession when, as a distant Gonzaga cousin, he claimed the Duchy of Mantua after the extinction of the senior male branch of the House of Gonzaga in December 1627. He was nominally supported by Emperor Ferdinand II, who really sought to re-attach the Duchy of Mantua to the Holy Roman Empire. His attempt failed as the French candidate Charles of Nevers became the new duke. Ferrante died of the plague on 6 August 1630.

== Marriage & issue ==
Ferrante II married Vittoria Doria (1569–1618), daughter of Giovanni Andrea Doria, and had:

- Cesare II Gonzaga (1592–1632), next Duke of Guastalla, married Donna Isabella Orsini
- Vincenzo Gonzaga (1602–1697), Viceroy of Sicily (1677–1678)
- Andrea Gonzaga, Count of San Paolo (died 1686), father of Vincenzo Gonzaga, Duke of Guastalla (1692–1714)
- Zenobia de Gonzaga y Doria (1588–1618), married in 1607 don Giovanni Tagliavia d'Aragona, Duke of Terranova.

== Sources ==
- Grendler, Paul F. (2009). The University of Mantua, the Gonzaga, and the Jesuits, 1584–1630. Johns Hopkins University Press.
- Grendler, Paul F. (2017). The Jesuits and Italian Universities, 1548-1773. The Catholic University Press of America.
- Parrott, David (1997). "A prince souverain and the French crown: Charles de Nevers, 1580-1637". In Oresko, Robert; Gibbs, G. C.; Scott, H. M. (eds.). Royal and Republican Sovereignty in Early Modern Europe: Essays in Memory of Ragnhild Hatton. Cambridge University Press.
- Runschke, Florian (2019). "Das Generalkommissariat in Italien von 1624-1632. Auftrag, Arbeit und Akzeptanz der ersten beiden Amtsinhaber". Quellen und Forschungen aus italienischen Archiven und Bibliotheken (in German). 99: 201–242.

Preceded by Cesare I	Count of Guastalla; 1575–1630	Succeeded by Cesare II
