= Guastalla =

- Comune
- Città di Guastalla
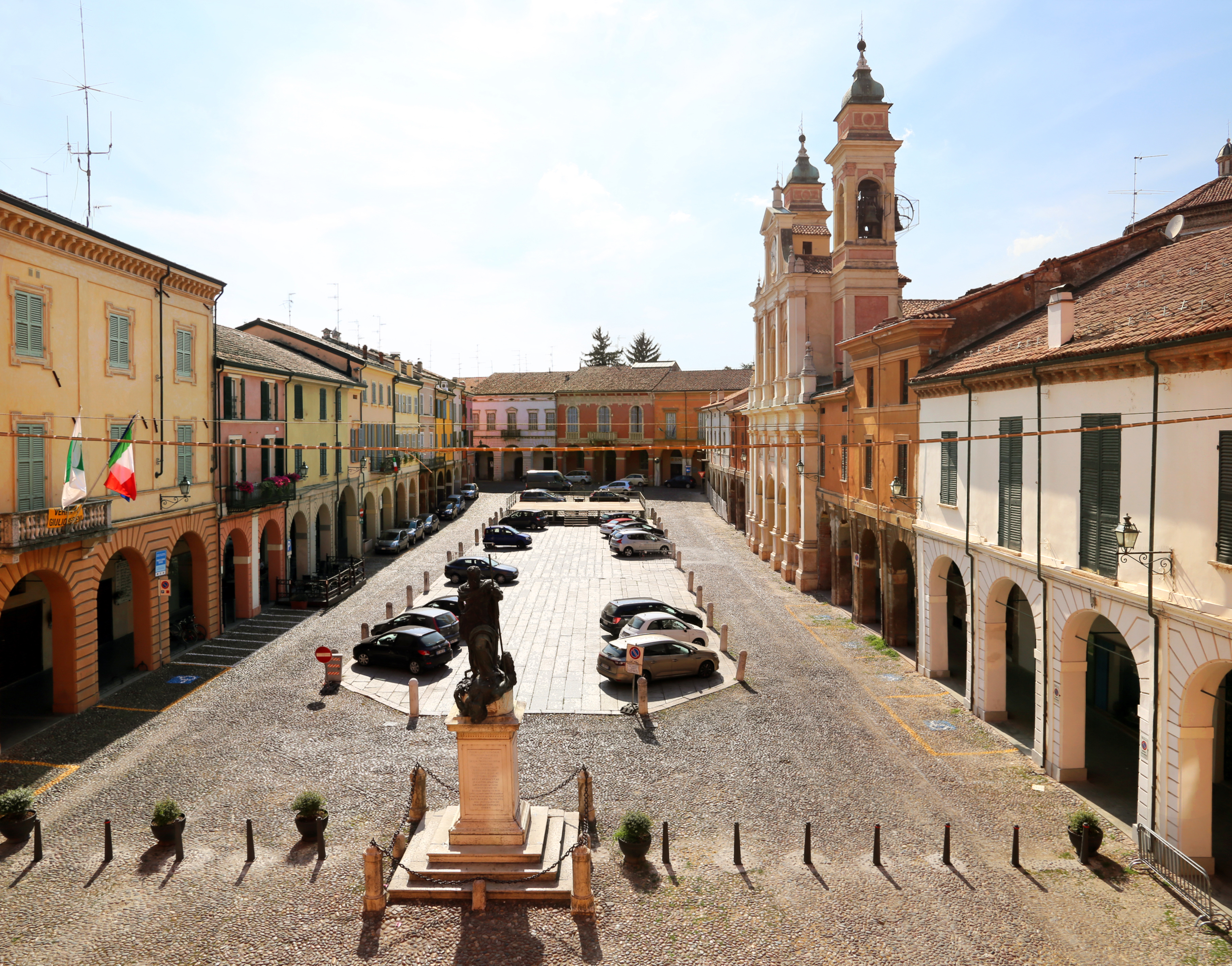
- View of Guastalla

- Flag Coat of arms

- Location within Italy Location within Emilia-Romagna
- Coordinates: 44°55′N 10°40′E
- Country: Italy
- Region: Emilia-Romagna
- Province: Reggio Emilia (RE)
- Frazioni: Pieve, San Giacomo, San Giorgio, San Girolamo, San Martino, San Rocco, Tagliata

Government
  - Mayor: Camilla Verona

Area
  - Total: 52.5 km^{2} (20.3 sq mi)
- Elevation: 24 m (79 ft)

Population (31 December 2016)
  - Total: 15,100
  - Density: 288/km^{2} (745/sq mi)
- Demonym: Guastallesi
- Time zone: UTC+1 (CET)
  - Summer (DST): UTC+2 (CEST)
- Postal code: 42016
- Dialing code: 0522
- Patron saint: St. Francis
- Saint day: October 4
- Website: www.comune.guastalla.re.it

Guastalla (Guastallese: Guastàla) is a town and comune in the province of Reggio Emilia in Emilia-Romagna, Italy.

== Geography ==
Guastalla is situated in the Po Valley, and lies on the banks of the Po River. Guastalla is located at around 30 kilometres (19 mi) from the cities of Reggio Emilia, Parma, and Mantua.

In addition to the town of Guastalla itself, the comune also includes the hamlets of San Giacomo, San Girolamo, San Martino, San Rocco, and Tagliata.

== History ==
The area of Guastalla was probably settled by Etruscans as early as the 7th century BC, but the name of the city is mentioned for the first time in 864 AD. During the Middle Ages, Guastalla was the centre of a rich agricultural estate, or curtes, and was used as a toll point for merchandise passing up and down the River Po. Of Lombard origin, the city was ruled by the Torelli family from 1406 to 1539, when it became the capital of a duchy under the Gonzaga family and housed artists like Guercino and Torquato Tasso. From 1621 to 1748, it was part of its own Duchy of Guastalla. Then with the Treaty of Aix-la-Chapelle, the city became part of the Duchy of Parma, Piacenza e Guastalla, to which it belonged until 1847, when it was inherited by the Duke of Modena. Since the unification of Italy in 1861, Guastalla has been a part of Italy proper.

=== Industry ===
Bertazzoni, Beginning in 1882, Bertazzoni became a major manufacturer of domestic ovens and other domestic appliances, initially based on wood burning stoves that were in trains passing through Guastalla, nowadays it is one of the leading manufacturers of high-end domestic appliances worldwide.

SMEG (from Smalterie Metallurgiche Emiliane Guastalla), a major manufacturer of high-end domestic appliances, was founded by Vittorio Bertazzoni in Guastalla in 1948, where it still has its headquarters.

== Main sights ==
Guastalla town:

- The cathedral (16th century) by Francesco da Volterra.
- The Ducal Palace of Guastalla (1567).
- The Civic Theatre Ruggero Ruggeri (1671).
- The Town Hall.
- The octagonal Oratory of Madonna della Concezione.
- The church of Santa Maria dei Servi, designed by Francesco da Volterra. Noteworthy in the interior is a Deposition, canvas by Giuseppe Maria Crespi.
- The Civic Tower (18th century), in the location where once was the Spanish Castle

Around Guastalla:

- The Romanesque Oratory of St. George (probably from the 9th century).
- The Basilica of St. Peter at Pieve di Guastalla, which was seat of two Roman Catholic councils. It houses an ancient baptismal font (9th century) and painted terracotta portraying the Madonna with Child, attributed to Guido Mazzoni.

== Twin Towns ==
- Forcalquier, France
- Giovinazzo, Italy
- Gabicce Mare, Italy

== People ==
- Gaia (born 1997), singer-songwriter
- In-Grid (born 1973), dancer and singer-songwriter

== See also ==
- County of Guastalla
- Duchy of Guastalla
- Rulers of Guastalla
- Diocese of Guastalla
