= History of Castel Goffredo =

History of the municipality of Castel Goffredo, Italy

The history of Castel Goffredo, an Italian municipality located in Upper Mantua on the border with the province of Brescia, began in the first half of the 3rd millennium B.C., although the present town was founded in Roman times (1st century A.D.) and then developed over the following centuries. In the early medieval period the history of the city was closely linked to the control of the powerful families of the Visconti, Della Scala and the Republic of Venice. However, the city's history remains inextricably linked to the Gonzaga, who ruled it for 400 years. An autonomous fief from 1444 to 1602 under the first marquis Alessandro Gonzaga, it was at this town, in 1511 with Aloisio Gonzaga, that the collateral branches of the "Gonzaga of Castel Goffredo, Castiglione and Solferino" and the minor branch of the "Gonzaga of Castel Goffredo" originated, which died out in 1593. Castel Goffredo became one of the historic Gonzaga capitals, the forerunner of other small capitals from Castiglione to Sabbioneta, due to its urban layout of 1480, equipped with a strict orthogonal grid. With the advent of Napoleon, the town was part of the Cisalpine Republic and, after its fall, of the Kingdom of Lombardy-Venetia; in 1861 it was finally united to the Kingdom of Italy, following its subsequent historical events.

It is known as the "hosiery city" due to the presence of numerous hosiery industries.

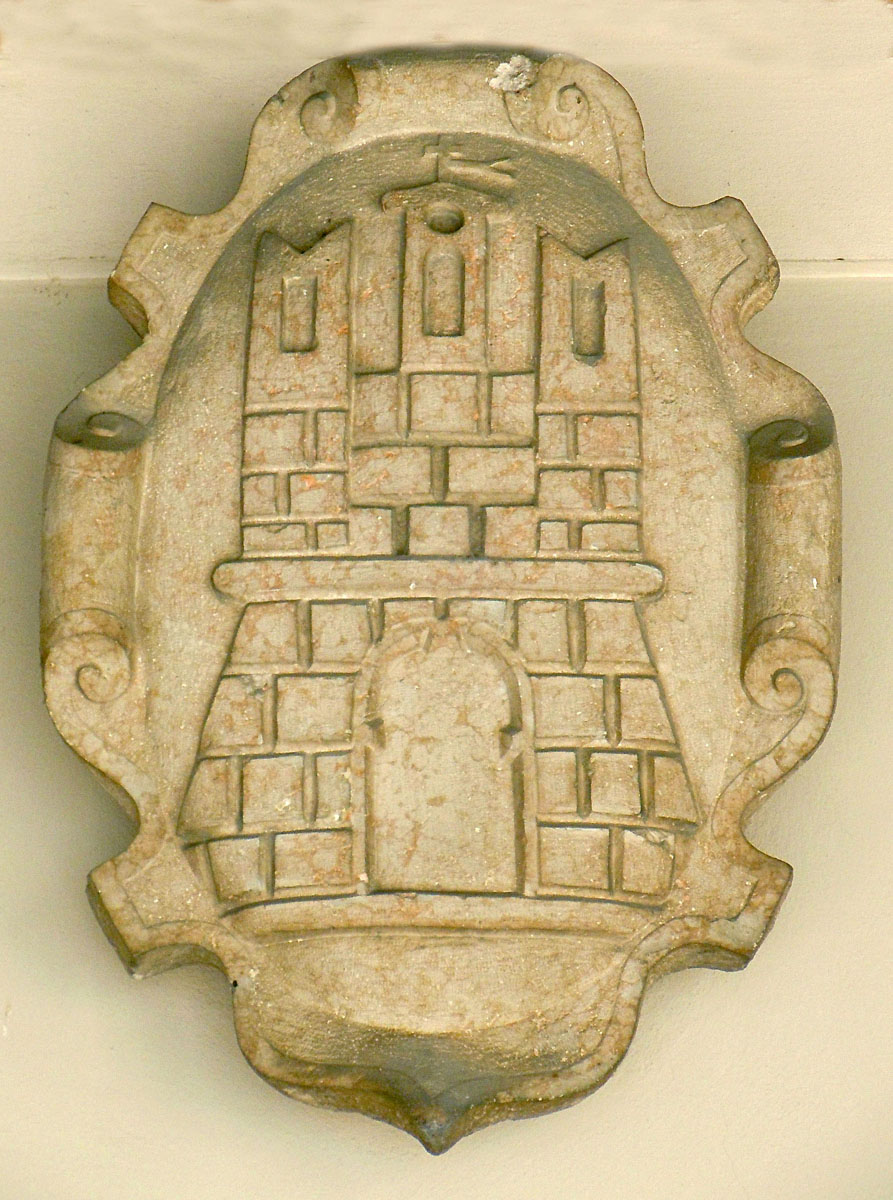
Coat of arms of the city at its entrance

== Origins of the name ==
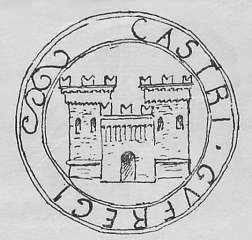
Seal of 1515

On the origin of the toponym composed of castrum (fortification) and an unspecified "Goffredo" (from the Germanic Gottfried meaning "peace of God"), there are several hypotheses. Many scholars have tried to find its precise meaning.

=== Ancient documents ===
An 1164 imperial decree of Frederick I identifies Castel Goffredo as follows: Curtem de Runco Sigifredi cum castro et ecclesia, thus implying that the second part of the name was derived from Sigifredi. In a document dated August 1192 and signed by Emperor Henry VI, Castrigufredi is mentioned.

The poet Matteo Bandello (1554), in his work Canti XI, composed in Castel Goffredo while he was a guest of the Marquis Aloisio Gonzaga, already referred to a person named Gioffredo: "... I arrived at the castle that bears Gioffredo's name". (Note: For the first time the name of the town was mentioned in a literary work: Matteo Bandello (1554). Canti XI de le lodi de la signora Lucretia Gonzaga de Gazuolo, e del vero amore, col tempio di pudicizia, e con altre cose per dentro poeticamente descritte.)

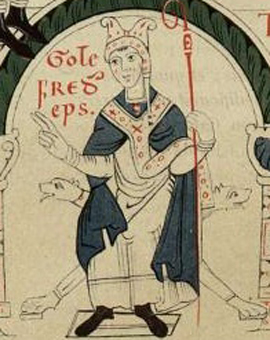
Bishop Goffredo of Canossa

=== Studies ===
The first to study the meaning of "Goffredo" was Carlo Gozzi, who in 1810 ventured some hypotheses, but without reaching a definite conclusion: Godfrey of Bouillon, Godfrey the Hunchback, husband of Matilda of Canossa, Goffredo Malaterra, Godfrey of Viterbo or Geoffrey of Vendôme.

Historian Francesco Bonfiglio, on the basis of some historical research carried out around 1920, would trace the name of the town back to a document dated July 8, 1107 in which Castello Vifredi (or Castrum Vifredi) is mentioned. (Note: The document dated 1107, July 8, is as follows: Matilda Comitissa uxor q.m Ugonis Comitis de Disenzano dona beni in: Marcaregiam, Mosum et Asolam cum ominibus rebus sibi pertinentibus, ut supralegitur in integrum, et omnes res sibi pertinentes in territorio Curtis et Castris Redolisco, et in Gausegnano, et in Casale alto, et in Satalino, et in Castello novo, et Buzolano, et in Ramedello de supra, et in Castello Vifredi, ed in Casale majori, et in Ravaria, et in Mazzano, et Carpenetulo, et in Casale Pauli, et in territorio Curtis et Castri Monteclaro, et in Calcinato, et in Lonato, et in Predizzo, et in Discenzano, tam infra ipsum Castrum, quantum et foris. Post eiusdem Metilde decessum habeat idem Monasterium totas iam dictas res iure proprietario, et quidquid inventum fuerit in sua portione ubique ex hac parte Olei omnia in integrum pro anime sue mercede, et Ugonis viri sui, et filiorum, filiarumque suarum.) In the proceedings of a conference held in 2009, it was hypothesized that the "Vifredi" mentioned in this 1107 document referred to Count Vifredo VI of Piacenza.

Recent studies (2010) would trace the name Vifredi back to a phonetic and graphic adaptation prevalent in the Middle Ages, which would have transformed Vifredus into Guifredus and then into Guffredus.

Another hypothesis links the name "Goffredo" to the Count and Bishop of Brescia, Goffredo of Canossa (10th century), great uncle of Countess Matilda, who had extensive possessions in the area, and who wanted to found Castrum Guffredi to defend his possessions; or to a Goffredo confaloniere (or Goffredo Confalonieri) of Medole, who was granted lands in Castel Goffredo by the Bishop of Mantua, Pellizzario, on July 8, 1230.

In ancient maps the town is mentioned with different names: Kastelo Gifredo, (Note: From a late 15th century map preserved in the State Archives of Mantua.) Castel Giufrìdo, Castel Zanfrìdo, Castel Zanfrìso, Castro Grifedo, Castriguffredi, Castri Gufregi, Castel Zufrè, Castel Giufrè, Castro Giuffredo and Castel Sufrè, in which the Latin etymology suffere leads to the name castrum suffers, meaning "strong castle", later changing to Castello Suffrè or Zuffrè. The exact spelling of the name is Castel Goffredo, although in ancient times and today it is often spelled Castelgoffredo or CastelGoffredo.

== Ancient times ==
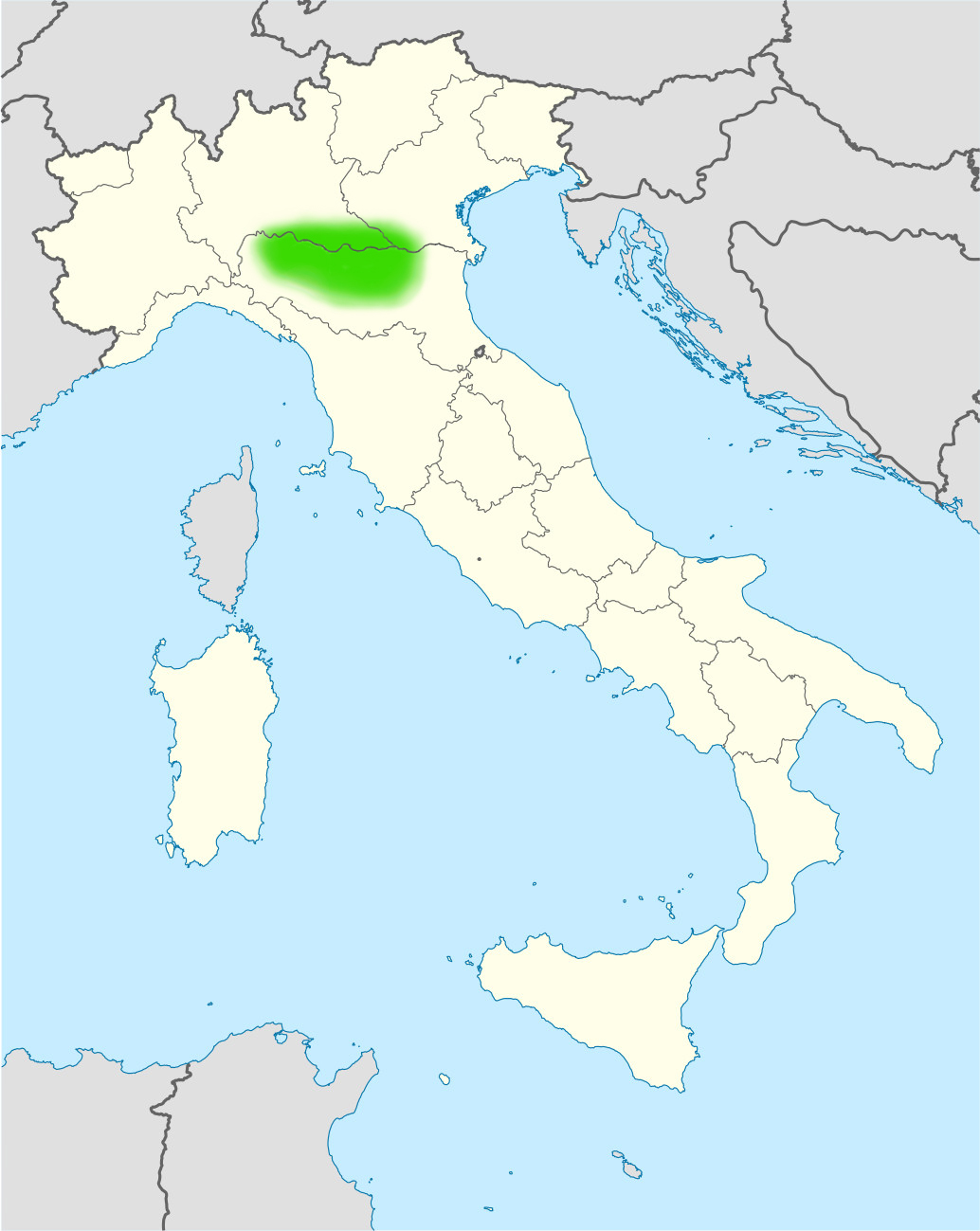
Area of maximum spread of Terramare (shown in green)

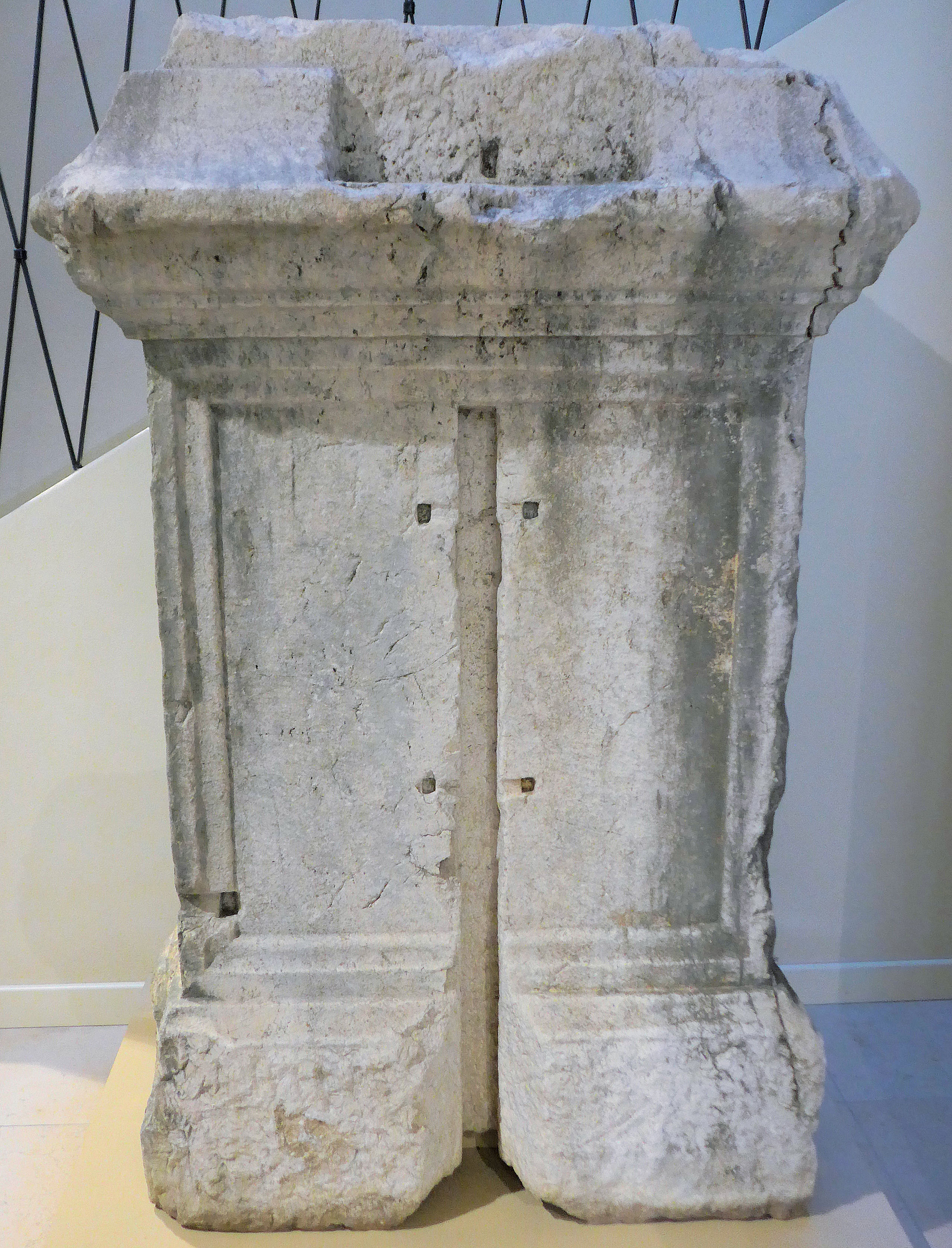
Roman anepigraphic altar found in the area, 1st century B.C. - 1st century A.D., MAST Castel Goffredo

Some archaeological finds (three arrowheads, a flint dagger, and human remains) unearthed in the Rassica archaeological area, have made it possible to hypothesize human presence in the water-rich territory of Castel Goffredo from as early as the Bronze Age. During the Middle Bronze Age (1600-1300 B.C.) Castel Goffredo was subject to the Terramare type of settlement. In 1890 during an excavation on the left bank of the Tartaro stream in the Rassica archaeological area, southeast of the settlement, a terramara was discovered on a small hump.

The area was also influenced by the Etruscan colonization, as evidenced by the discovery of important artifacts of daily use (cups and water jugs). The Celtic presence in the area is also confirmed by the discovery in 1980 of two burials and a fragment of an iron sword.

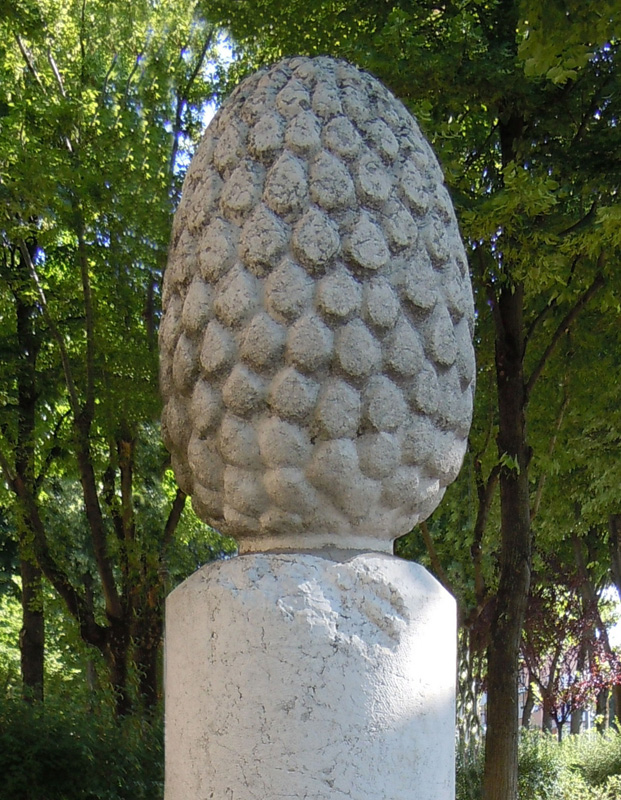
La Pigna, a Roman-era grave marker placed in the public gardens of Castel Goffredo

Some votive altars (Note: The votive altars have the following inscriptions: P.MAGIVS IOVI V.S.L.M. - L.QVINTILIVS L.F. EVBVLVS-PETRONIANVS PRO SE ET SVIS IOVI V.S.L.M.) and a tombstone found in Castel Goffredo and preserved at the Brescia Civic Museum also suggest a settlement in the Roman period (1st century A.D.). Prominent among the finds is the so-called "funerary stele of Publius Magius Manius" found in Casalpoglio, one of the most remarkable archaeological testimonies ever discovered in western Mantua. The following is the text of the inscription:

VIVUS [F.] (ecit)
PUBLIUS MAGIUS MANIUS
SIBI ET ASSELIAE MARCI FILIAE
SABINAE UXORI
ET SATRIAE MARCI FILIAE
TERTIAE
CASSIAE PUBLII FILIAE SECUNDAE
MATRI
While he was alive
Publius Magius Manius
erected (this stele) for himself, for his wife Asselia Sabina
daughter of Marcus
and for Satria
Marcus' third daughter,
for Cassia, the second
daughter of Publius

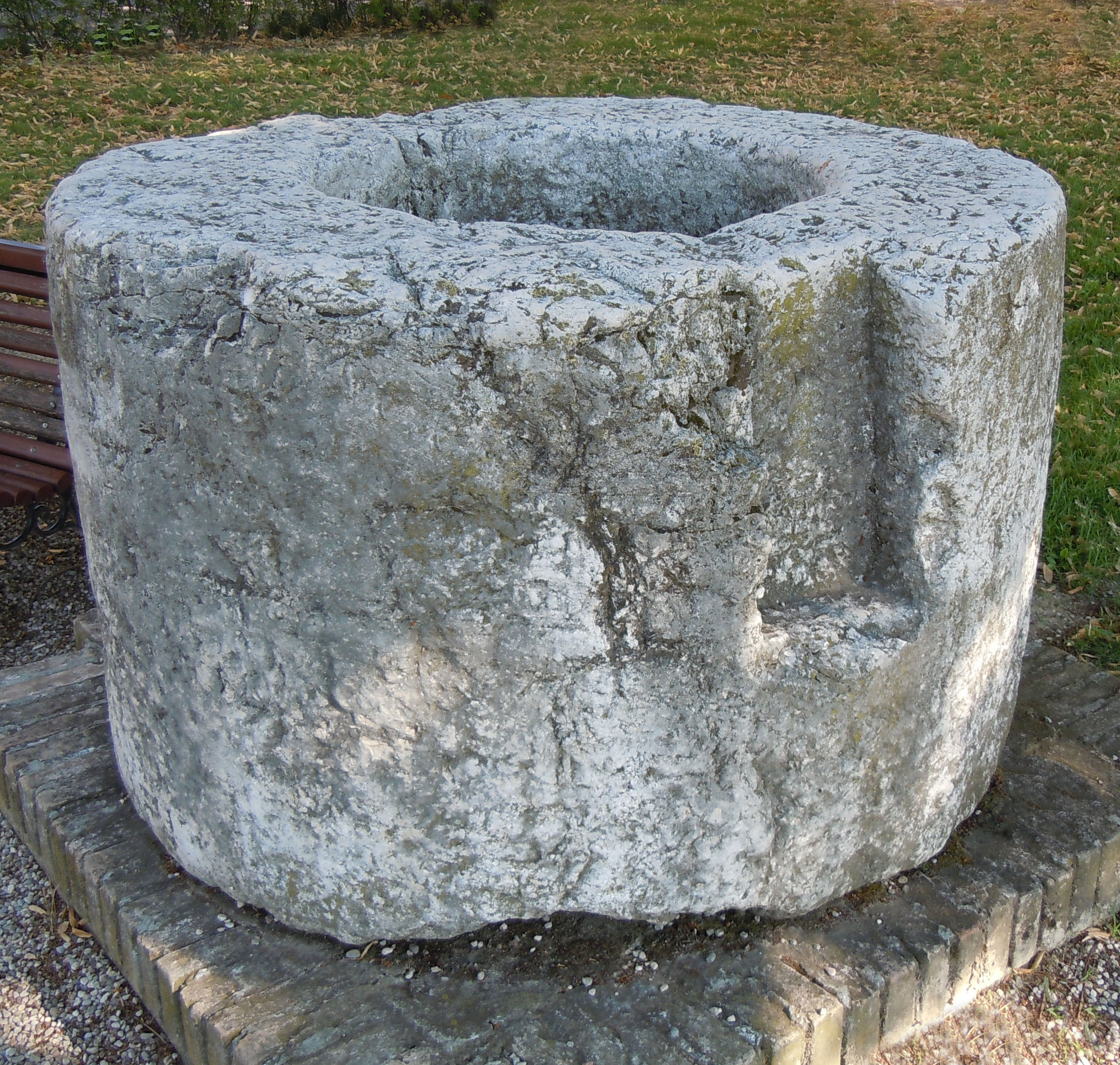
Gromatic cippus from the Roman period placed in the Public Gardens of Castel Goffredo

This area, which belonged to the Upper Mantuan area, was in fact subject to the centuriation of the territory of Mantua. From this period is the discovery in 1989, next to the Oratory of St. Michael the Archangel, of traces of a Roman necropolis, with pieces of pottery, bronze, mosaic tiles and coins. Regarding the Romanization of the historic center, some scholars assume that it was divided into twelve blocks and characterized by cardines and decumani, and that at the intersection of the "cardo maximus" and "decumanus maximus" was located the forum, today represented by Piazza Mazzini. The presence of the Lombards is also indicated by findings of marble bas-reliefs in the hamlet of Bocchere and a marble framed with a hexagonal star in the Oratory of St. Michael the Archangel in the hamlet of Zecchini.

== Middle Ages ==
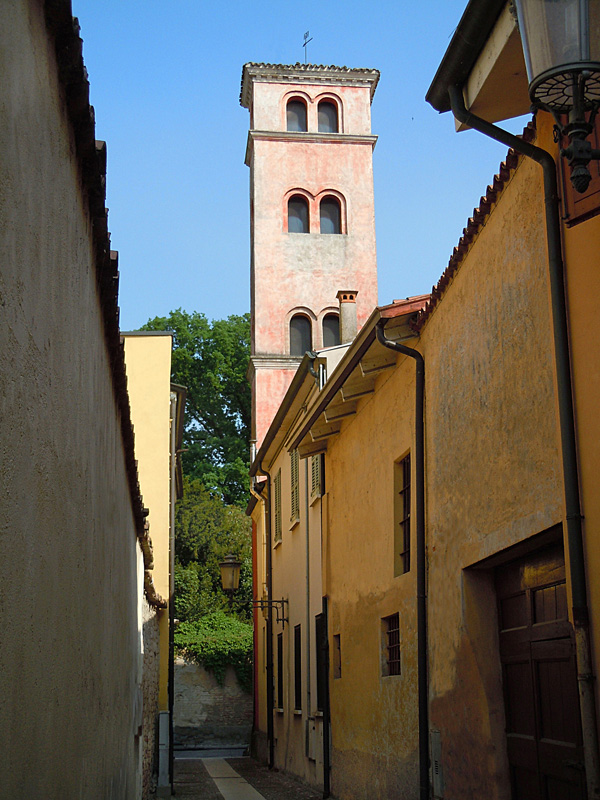
Charles V alley in Castelvecchio with the bell tower of the church of Santa Maria del Consorzio

Upon the fall of the Lombards, around the year 800, Castel Goffredo became part of the district of Sirmione, which stretched between Chiese and Mincio, and until 1115 belonged to the county of Brescia. The most important evidence of the presence of the settlement is given by a document dated July 8, 1107, in which Countess Matilde of Desenzano, (Note: Not to be confused with the Grand Countess Matilda of Canossa.) widow of Ugone, count of Desenzano, made a conspicuous donation of goods to the Benedictine monastery of San Tommaso of Acquanegra: in it some places in Upper Mantua and eastern Lower Brescia are mentioned, among them Castello Vifredi. To that time (between 900 and 1000) dates the origin of the first fortification of the city called Castellum vetus, “Castelvecchio,” also including the castle, now disappeared. (Note: Castelvecchio occupied the northern part of the town and included Cannone Street, the Gonzaga-Acerbi Palace, the church of Santa Maria del Consorzio, Piazzetta Castelvecchio and the surrounding alleys.) Later, from about 1115 to 1190, it belonged to the Longhi counts, a noble family from Desenzano that extended its properties from Lake Iseo to the lower Chiese. Banished by Frederick II, the Longhi counts lost their power, and around 1254 the municipalities of Brescia and Mantua established the boundaries of their territories.

In the thirteenth century Castel Goffredo was besieged by Ezzelino da Romano, the Della Scala of Verona and the Visconti of Milan. At that time Mantua was evolving toward a lordship, and in 1272 the Bonacolsi family took power with Pinamonte. The lineage reached the height of its prestige on August 16, 1328, with the capture of Mantua, when Ludovico I Gonzaga, backed by Cangrande I della Scala, seized power by mortally wounding the last of the Bonacolsi, Rinaldo, also known as Passerino.

=== The Gonzaga ===
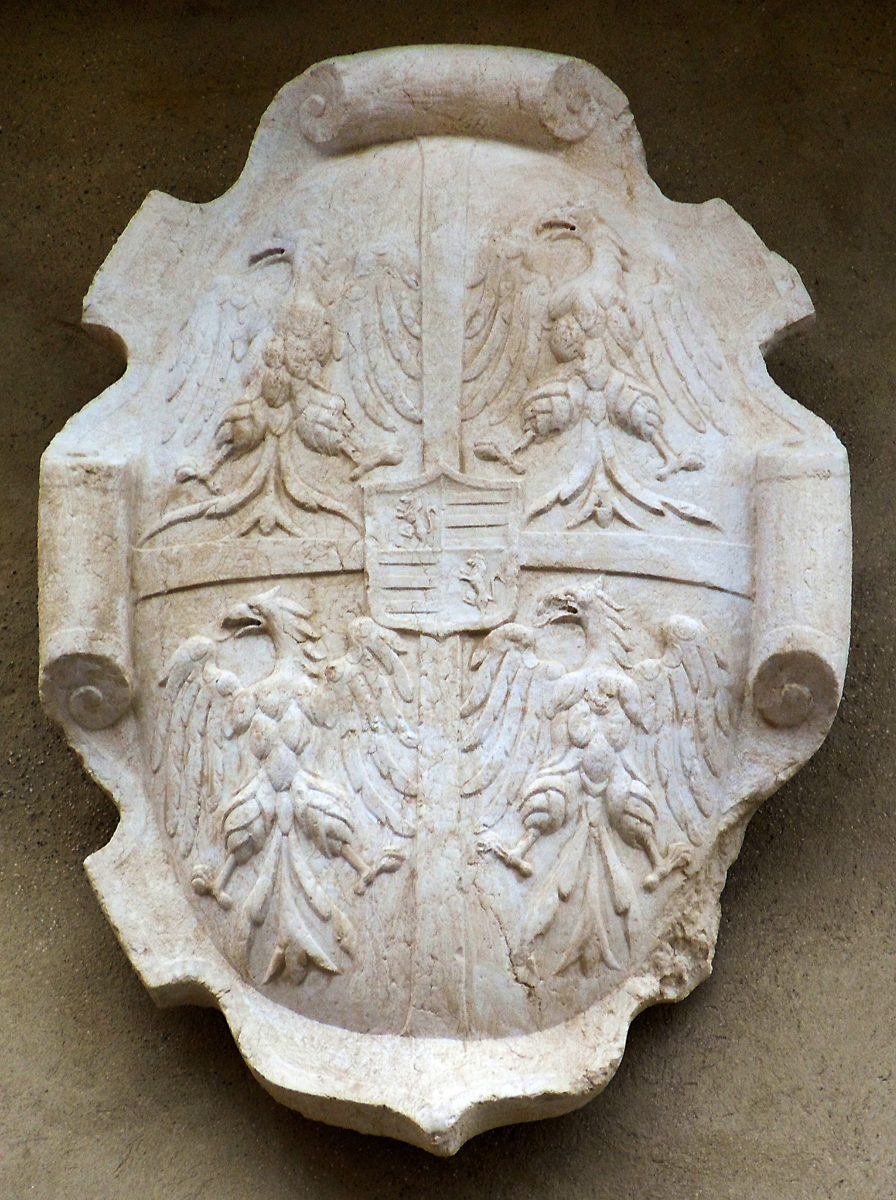
Coat of arms of the Gonzaga family, on the civic tower of Castel Goffredo (16th century)

Castel Goffredo granted itself the status of a free commune when Brescia was unable to defend it. Then, on September 20, 1337, the population preferred to place itself under the protection of Luigi I Gonzaga, first captain of the people of Mantua, by public deed of the notary Giacomino Gandolfi. (Note: Notary Giacomino Gandolfi's document mentions Guidone dei Gonzaga as lord of Mantua. Indeed, Luigi Gonzaga, now in his seventies, led the government with his sons Guido and Ugolino.) Thus began the rule of the Gonzaga seigniory, destined to last until 1707. The first vicar with civil and military powers was Ambrogio de Ferrari, who resided in the Torrazzo, while the offices were located in the nearby palace.

In 1348, at the outbreak of the Gonzaga war against the Visconti, Scaligeri and Estensi, the Duke of Milan Luchino Visconti took the border lands away from Mantua, and Castel Goffredo remained subject to Milan until 1404. For a short time, from 1426 to 1431, the municipality passed to the Republic of Venice and then returned under Gianfrancesco Gonzaga, fifth Captain of the People of Mantua, in 1431. For the second time, from 1439 to 1441, it was governed by the Most Serene Republic of Venice, and in 1441 it passed definitively to Gianfrancesco Gonzaga, first marquis of Mantua who, by signing the Peace of Cremona (or Peace of Cavriana), accepted the acquisition of the territories of Castel Goffredo, Castiglione delle Stiviere, Solferino, Redondesco and Canneto sull'Oglio. These new lands, in the Gonzaga territory, were called "New Mantua." With Gianfrancesco's death in 1444 came the first division of the Mantuan state. In his will, he bequeathed the lordship of many Mantuan hamlets to his third son, Marquis Alessandro, a disciple of Vittorino da Feltre, (Note: In addition to Castel Goffredo: Medole, Castiglione, Ostiano, Canneto, Redondesco, Guidizzolo, Solferino, Volongo, Casalromano and Rocca di Mariana.) and of Castel Goffredo as an imperial fief autonomous from Mantua. Thus was founded the Marquisate of Castel Goffredo.

=== Marquisate of Castel Goffredo ===
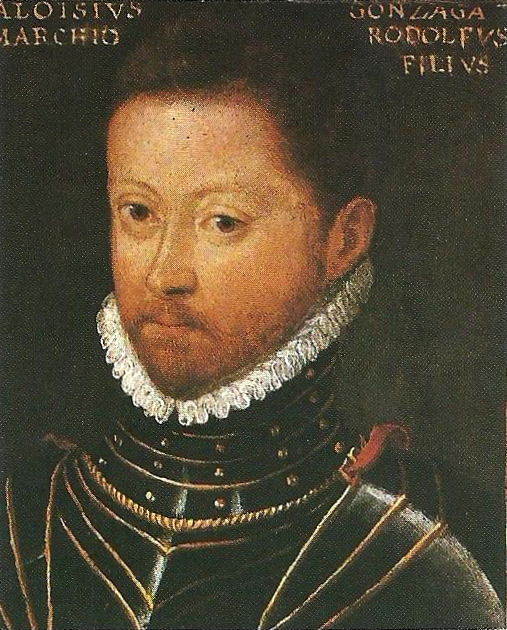
Aloisio Gonzaga, marquis of Castel Goffredo

Alessandro Gonzaga was responsible for the expansion of the town and the building of a second defensive wall. He issued a statute called the “Alessandrino” containing administrative rules for his fief and which remained in force until 1796. He also instituted, on July 1, 1457, the Thursday market and the fair of San Luca. Alessandro died childless in 1466, leaving his estates to his brother Ludovico II, second marquis of Mantua known as the Turk. The jurist Anselmo Folengo was appointed vicar of the Gonzagas in Castel Goffredo. The establishment of a loan bank run by Leone Ebreo dates back to 1468, which was suppressed in 1477 because of the high interest rates on loans. However, under the protection of the Gonzagas, the bank continued to operate until the fall of the Duchy of Mantua (1707). In 1475 Francesco Prendilacqua held the post of vicar of the Gonzagas. From 1478 to 1479, by testamentary succession of Ludovico II, his sons Rodolfo and Ludovico, bishop of Mantua, governed jointly. In 1480 the military architect Giovanni da Padova was commissioned to strengthen the defensive walls and the construction of the ravelin.

Rodolfo Gonzaga (1452-1495)
Gianfrancesco (1488-1524)	Aloisio (1494-1549)
Branch of Luzzara	Alfonso (1541-1592)	Orazio (1545-1587)	Ferrante (1544-1586)
Ferdinando	Caterina (wife of Carlo Trivulzio) (1574-1615?)	Giulia (1576-?)	Ginevra (1578-?)	Giovanna	Maria	Luigia	Luigi (1550-?)	Branch of Solferino	Rodolfo (1569-1593)	Francesco (1577-1616)
Branch of Castel Goffredo (extinct)	Branch of Castiglione

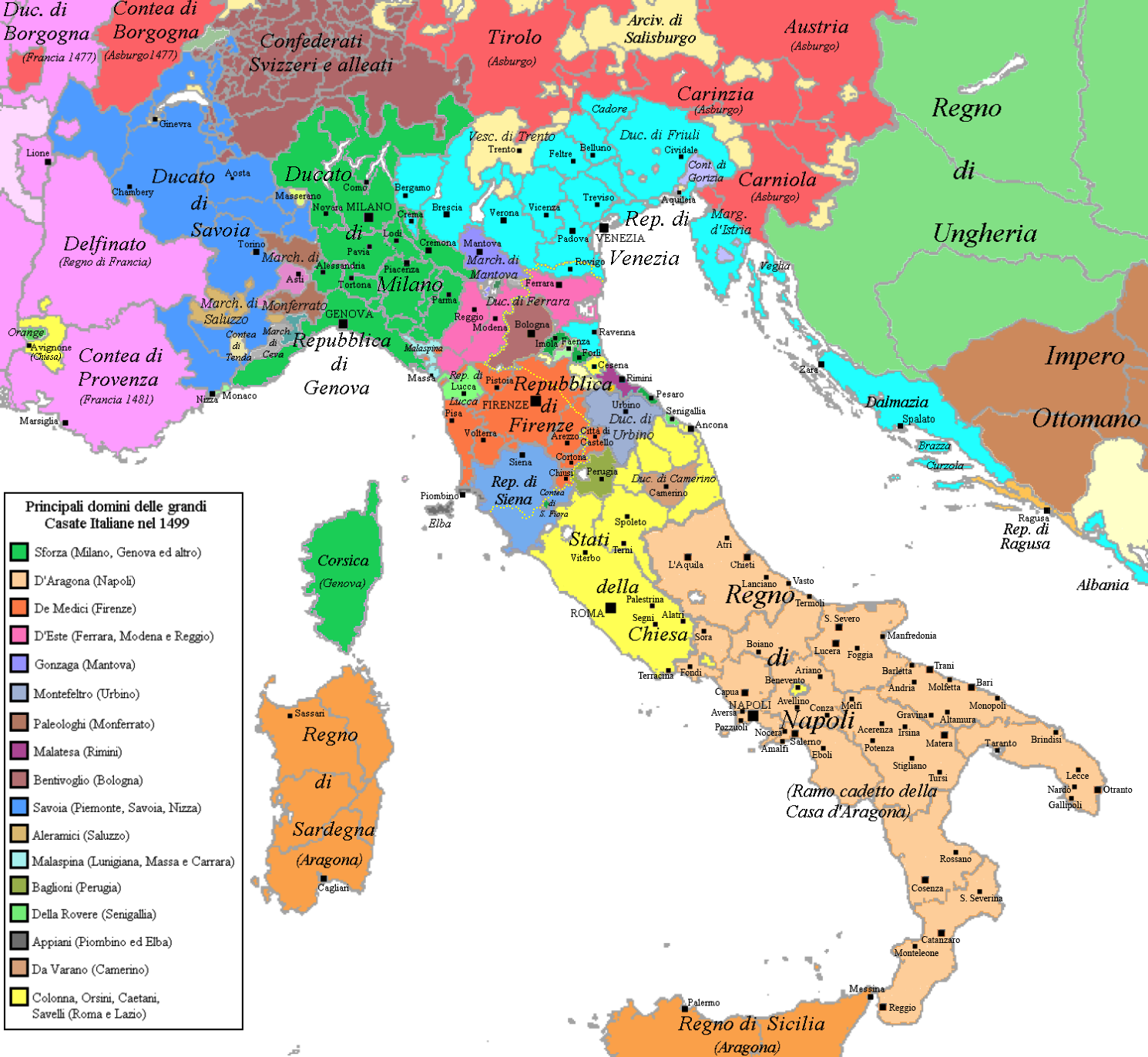
The great Italian houses in 1499

== Modern age ==
Bishop Ludovico and his brother Rodolfo divided their possessions: the fief of Castel Goffredo, along with Ostiano and Redondesco, remained with Ludovico, who ruled from 1479 to 1511. Upon Ludovico's death in 1511, after a long dispute at the imperial court, the state of Castel Goffredo, Castiglione and Solferino passed to his nephew Marquis Aloisio (or Luigi Alessandro).

=== Constitution of the parish ===
The year of the establishment of the parish of Castel Goffredo is unknown: a document from the second decade of the 16th century reports that Mantuan dean Guidone di Bagno is said to be rector of the parish church of Santa Maria of Castel Goffredo in the Diocese of Brescia. Until 1785, when Emperor Joseph II ordered the aggregation to the Diocese of Mantua, the parish belonged to the Brescian diocese.

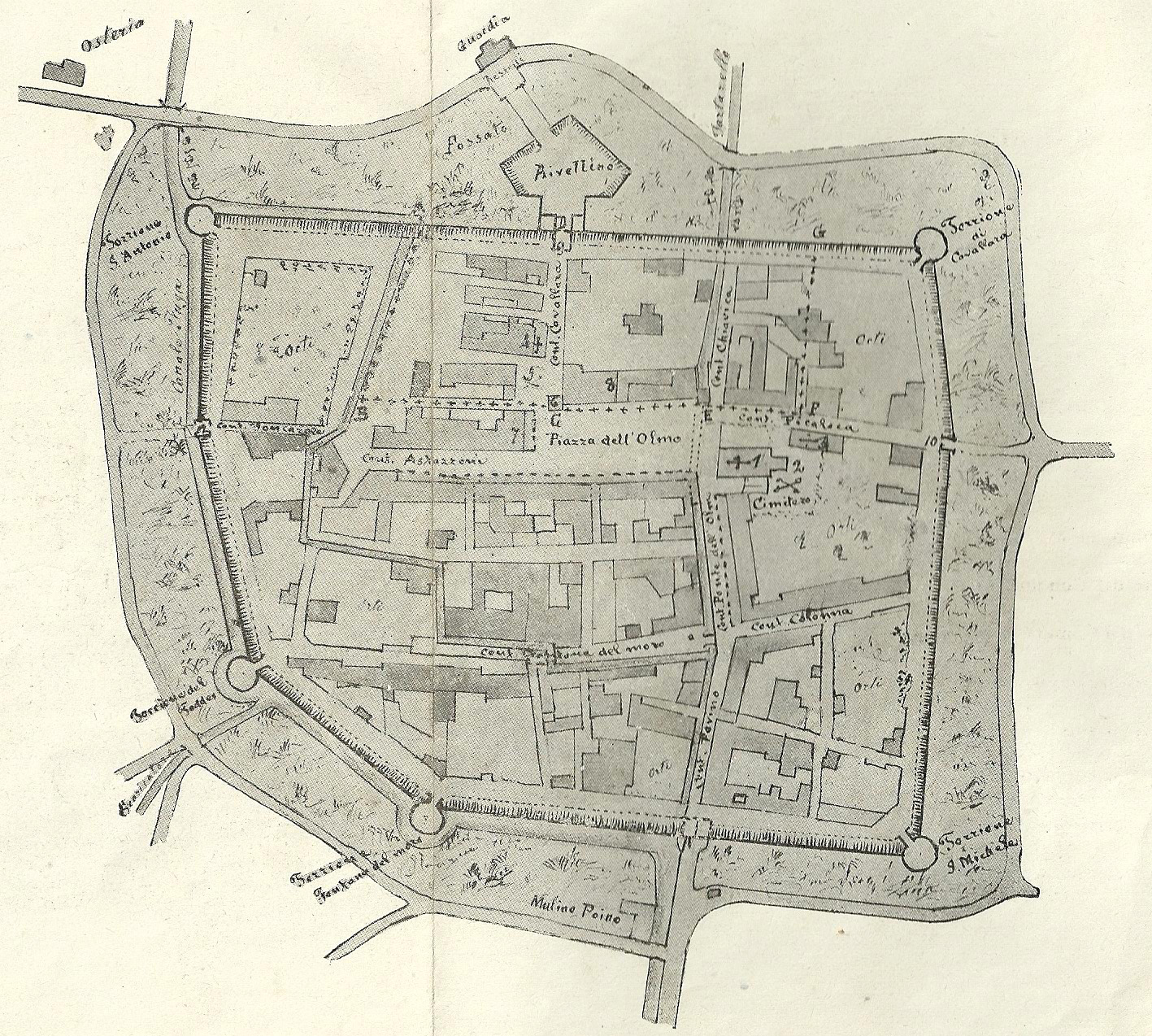
Fortress of Castel Goffredo in the 1500s.

=== Gonzaga court and the visit of Charles V ===
The marquisate of Castel Goffredo of the minor branch of the "Gonzaga of Castel Goffredo" began with Aloisio. He made his palace the seat of a sumptuous court, which hosted illustrious figures, including imperial captain Louis Gonzaga "Rodomonte," the poet Pietro Aretino in 1536, from 1538 to 1541 the writer Matteo Bandello (protected by Isabella d'Este, where he met Lucrezia Gonzaga of Gazzuolo, who became his muse and with whom he fell in love), (Note: For Lucrezia Gonzaga, Bandello composed Canti XI.) condottiero Cesare Fregoso, Costanza Rangoni (Note: In 1540 Costanza Rangoni gave birth to her last son Cesare in Castel Goffredo.) and their children, Paolo Battista Fregoso, a military relative of Cesare, ambassador Antonio Rincon and chiromancy scholar Friar Patrizio Tricasso da Ceresara.

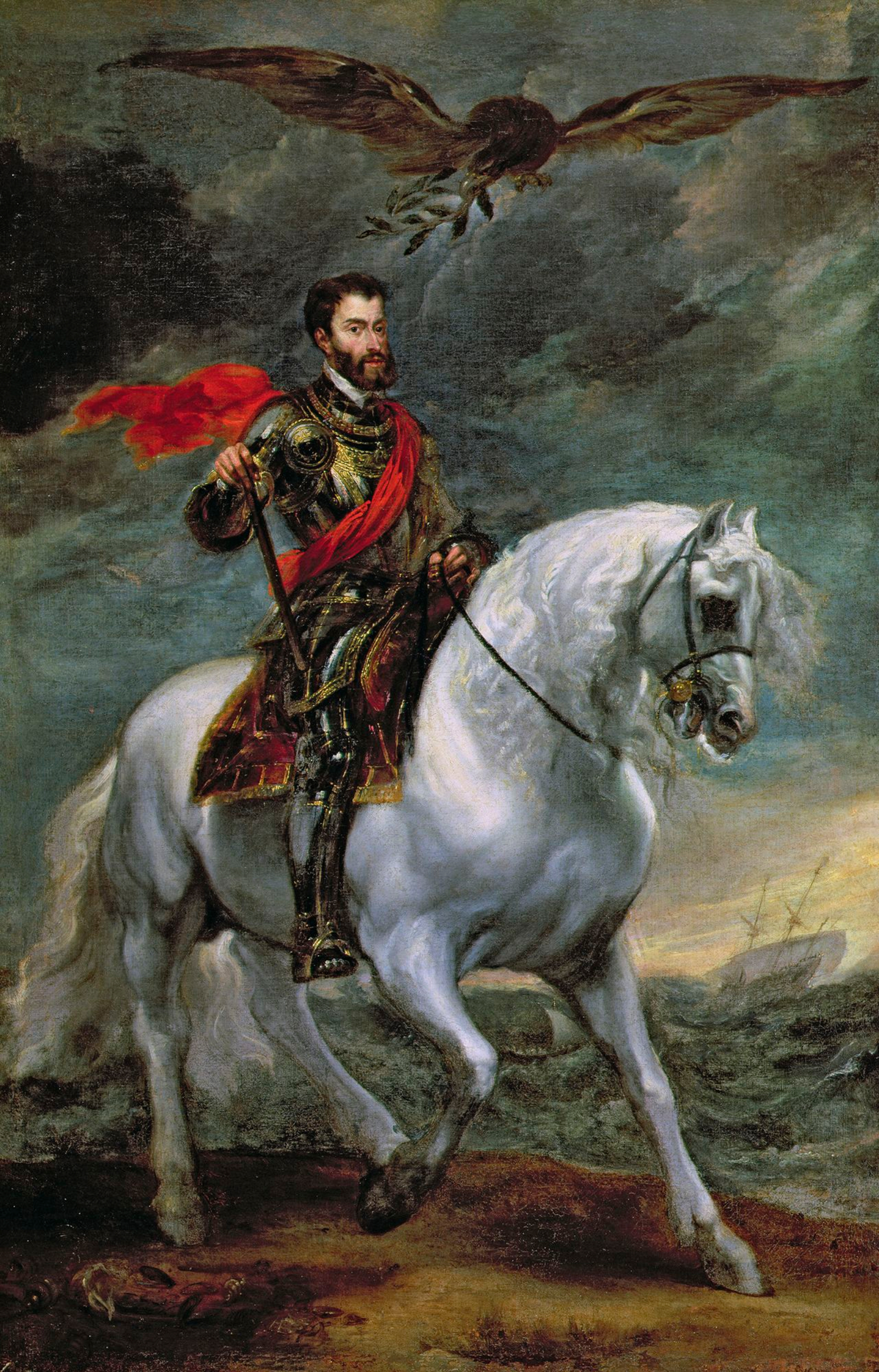
Emperor Charles V in 1543 was a guest of Aloisio Gonzaga in Castel Goffredo

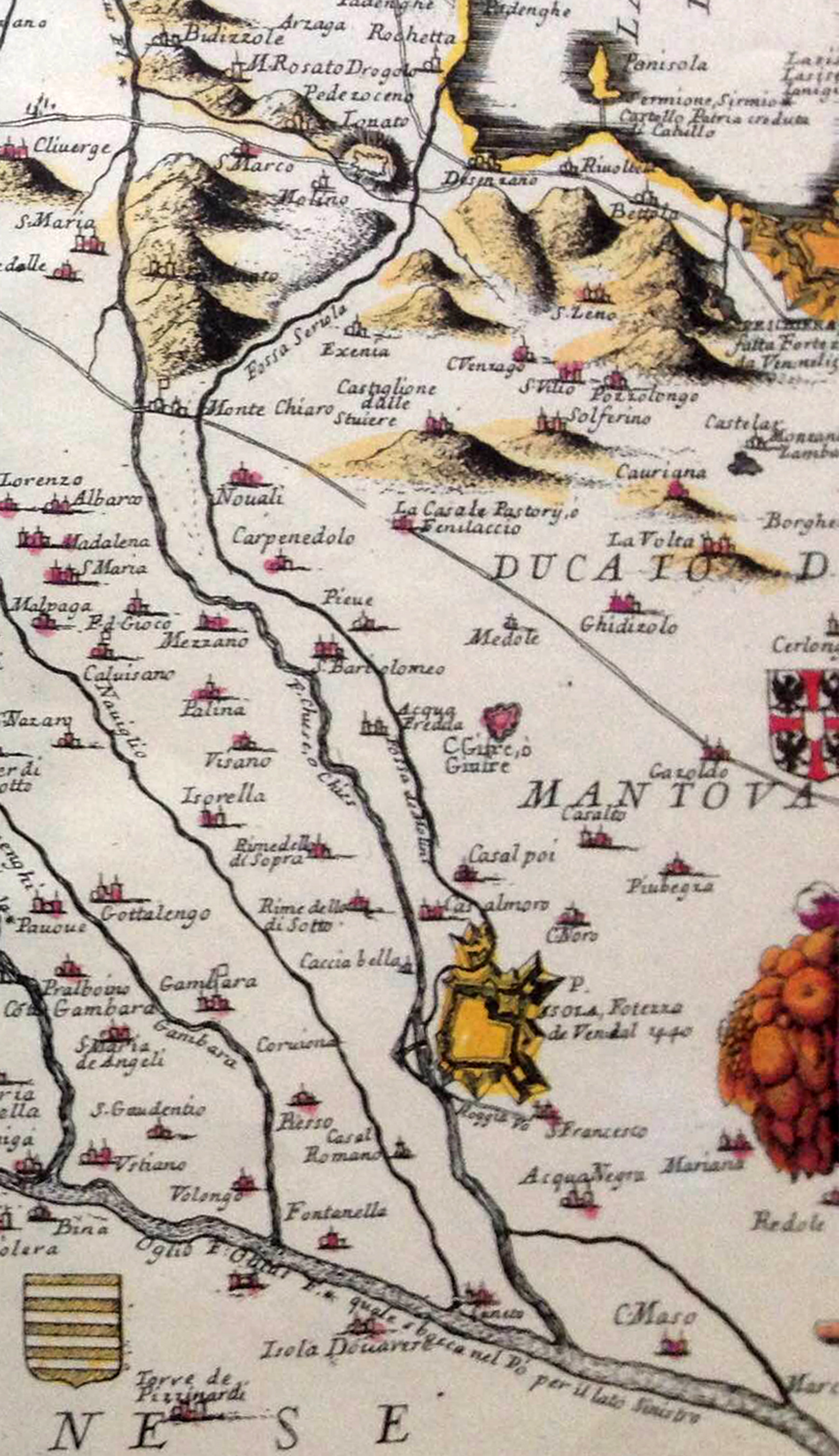
Map of the Duchy of Mantua in the seventeenth century including Castel Goffredo.

Frescoes from the school of Giulio Romano remain in the loggia of his palace, important pictorial evidence of that period. In 1516, Emperor Maximilian I passed through Castel Goffredo while pursuing French troops and headed to besiege Asola, and another emperor, Charles V, was a guest at the court of Castel Goffredo on June 28, 1543. He obtained the keys to the fortress and departed the following day. An anonymous manuscript reads:

It was this visit that the Marquis [Aloisio Gonzaga] so longed for, and nothing else, that caused him to change, so to speak, the face of the country. There was not a house, not an exterior wall, in which one could not see majestic loggias, military trophies, Egyptian vases, and ornaments of all kinds painted in frescoes, so that it looked more than a city, it looked like a magnificent and astonishing theater.

Charles V was on his way from Busseto, where he met Pope Paul III, to Trent and held talks in the Castle of Canneto with Ferrante Gonzaga, Cardinal Ercole Gonzaga, and Margaret Paleologa, to legitimize to his son Francesco the double investiture in the titles of Duke of Mantua and Marquis of Monferrato, as well as agreeing on his future marriage to Catherine, the emperor's niece. In 1543 in some places in the Gonzaga state (Castel Goffredo, Gonzaga, and Viadana) the first Lutheran theories began to emerge, which worried Cardinal Ercole Gonzaga, Bishop of Mantua.

Upon Aloisio's death in 1549, he was succeeded by his eldest son Alfonso Gonzaga and the government of the marquisate fell to his mother Caterina Anguissola (d. 1550), through her brother-in-law Giovanni Anguissola and until 1558. Alfonso, having obtained the imperial nomination in 1559, resided in Spain until 1564 and governed his fief from 1565. On May 8, 1568, he called the Jewish family Norsa from Mantua to continue the lending business and establish a mount of piety. A synagogue located in the present-day Vicolo Remoto was also built. That year also saw the establishment in Castel Goffredo, as in other localities of the Mantua area, (Note: The other places where the Mount of Piety was established were: Mantua, Castiglione delle Stiviere, Gonzaga, Rolo, Bozzolo, Rivarolo Mantovano, Sabbioneta, Viadana, Dosolo, Pomponesco, Canneto, Ostiano and Redondesco.) of the Mount of Piety, which complemented the activity of the Jews, but on more advantageous terms and operated until 1799. Castel Goffredo in 1580 received the pastoral visit of Archbishop St. Charles Borromeo, with the aim of implementing the decisions of the Council of Trent. On May 6, 1592 Alfonso was assassinated for hereditary reasons at the Gambaredolo Court by eight assassins of his nephew Rodolfo di Castiglione, brother of St. Aloysius, who had renounced the marquisate to become a Jesuit. Rodolfo ruled Castel Goffredo with terror and committed all kinds of atrocities. He was killed on January 3, 1593, with an arquebus shot by Michele Volpetti during a popular conspiracy supported by the "Magnificent Community" of Castel Goffredo, while he was on his way to religious services in the provostal church of Sant'Erasmo accompanied by his wife Elena and daughter Cinzia.

The events surrounding the double murder of Marquises Alfonso and Rodolfo Gonzaga were dealt with by Rudolf Coraduz von und zu Nußdorf, in his capacity as imperial commissioner. Also to be settled was the dispute over the succession to the marquisate of Castel Goffredo, disputed by his brother Francesco Gonzaga of Castiglione and the Duke of Mantua Vincenzo I Gonzaga. Coraduz traveled to Mantua on April 18, 1595, where he was received at the Gonzaga court with great honors. On April 29, he was in Castel Goffredo to see the situation in the fortress and to receive direct information about events. This was followed by a brief visit to the marquis of Castiglione Francesco, to hear his reasons and report the outcome of the talks to the imperial court. Coraduz then returned to Prague.

His successor Francesco Gonzaga (Rodolfo had no sons), did not become lord of Castel Goffredo due to a long dispute at the imperial court, which in 1602 recognized the dominion to the fourth Duke of Mantua Vincenzo I Gonzaga. Thus ended the history of the town as an autonomous Gonzaga fief, as well as a lordship of the "Gonzaga of Castel Goffredo."

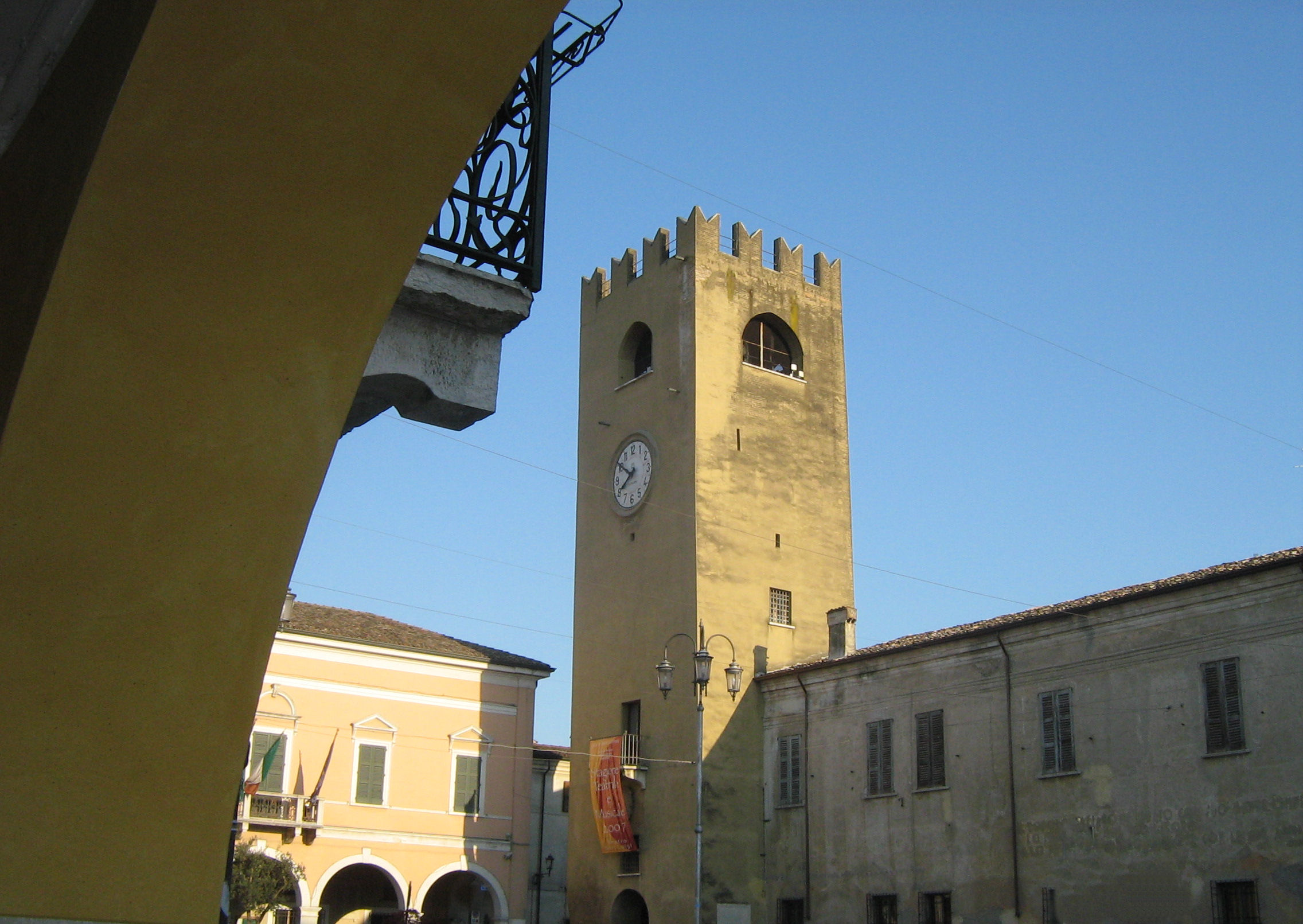
Mazzini square and civic tower

=== Under the Duchy of Mantua ===
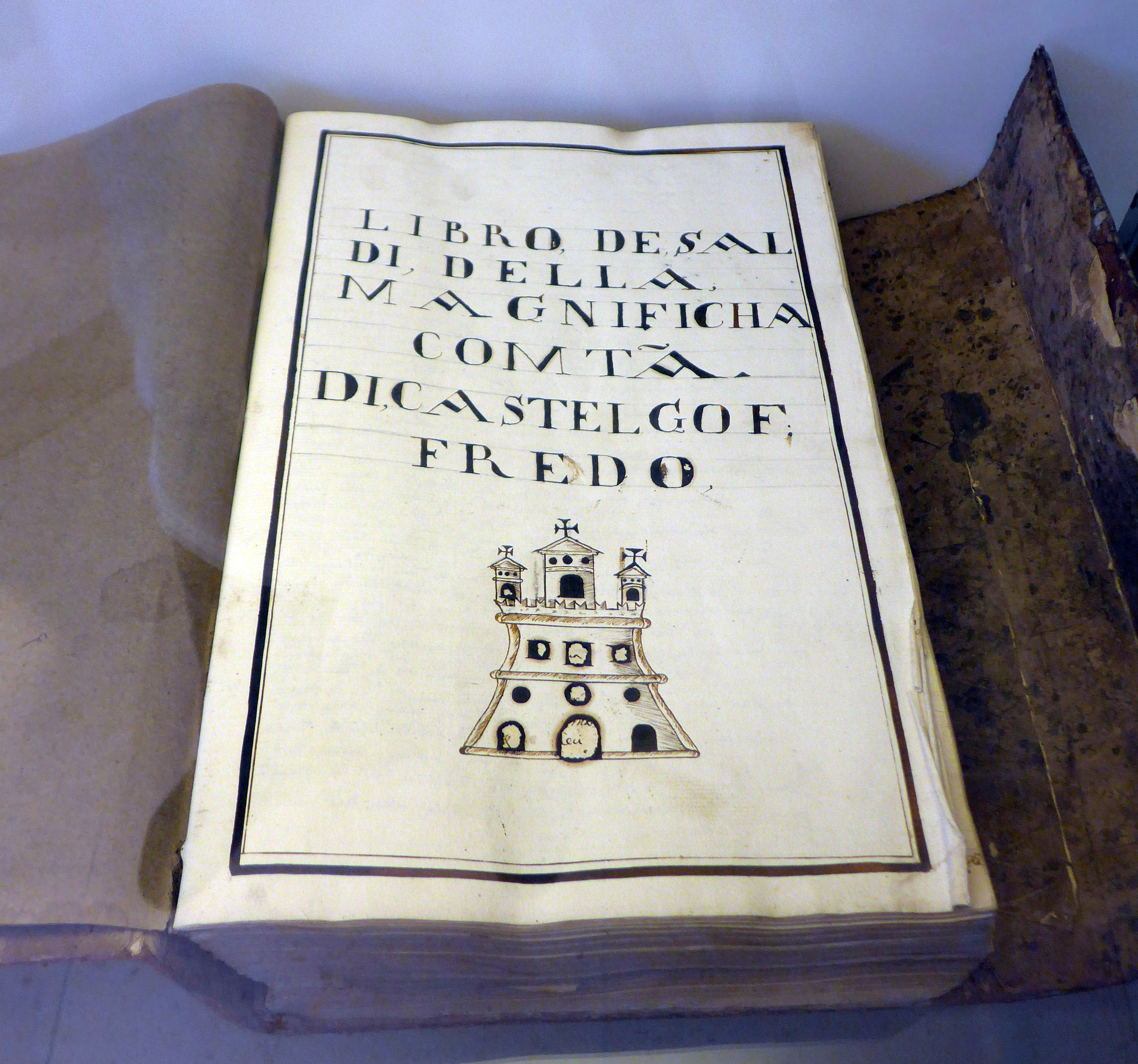
Balance book "Magnificent Community" of Castel Goffredo, 1738-1753, MAST Castel Goffredo

The territory of the state was the subject of a bitter dispute between the Marquis of Castiglione and the Duke of Mantua during the reign of Emperor Rudolph II. In 1602 Lawrence of Brindisi was commissioned by the emperor to act as ambassador to the Duke of Mantua Vincenzo I Gonzaga to return the fief to the Marquis of Castiglione. The mediation failed. On June 20, 1602, in the presence of the governor of Milan Pedro Henriquez de Acevedo and that of the bishop of Cremona Cesare Speciano, an agreement was signed between the duke of Mantua Vincenzo I and his cousin Francesco Gonzaga, marquis of Castiglione, for the cession of the fortress of Castel Goffredo in favor of Mantua against the exchange of the lands of Medole in favor of Francesco Gonzaga. The agreement ended the long dispute over the succession of the fortress, which occurred after the assassination of Marquis Rodolfo Gonzaga. Castel Goffredo was definitively annexed to the Duchy of Mantua in 1603, and remained so until 1707. Upon the descent of the imperials from Germany, the fortress of Castel Goffredo was momentarily recaptured by the Venetians, between 1629 and 1630, the year in which it was struck by the plague, which decimated two-thirds of its population, from 2,450 to 1,630 inhabitants. In 1707 the French left Italy and ceded Lombardy to Austria's Emperor Joseph I, although Mantua was still ruled by the Gonzaga: Ferdinando Carlo Gonzaga, the tenth and last duke of Mantua, lost the Gonzaga state and died in Padua on July 5, 1708. Thus ended four centuries of uninterrupted Gonzaga rule.

The Austrian occupation resulted in the requisitioning of supply warehouses in the town, and between 1705 and 1706 Austrian soldiers sacked Castel Goffredo, even holding some of the inhabitants as hostages. On July 3, 1735 Charles Emmanuel, King of Sardinia and Duke of Savoy, arrived as far as Castel Goffredo and took possession of the fortress. In 1796 Napoleon pushed the Austrians across the Mincio River, and in 1797 Austria ceded Lombardy to the French. On May 13, Castel Goffredo was occupied by French troops. At the end of the eighteenth century, Colonel Giacomo Acerbi began to breed silkworms and, with the approval of the Austrian government, opened a silk mill next to his palace.

Austrian governments followed in 1799, French in 1801-1814, and Austrian again until 1866.

=== Resurgence ===
In 1817, the current cemetery was built by the municipality, using material from the demolition of the city walls.

Around 1840, Giuseppe Acerbi began an important experiment: the autumn breeding of silkworms at his estate "La Palazzina". In the same period, Bartolomeo Riva began the industrial breeding of silkworms at his summer residence "Corte Palazzo", following the French model of Camille Beauvais' silkworm nursery. (Note: The process, invented by Frenchman Camille Beauvais, consisted of using large fans to remove stale air from the silkworm nursery and replace it with fresh air. The goal was to transform the egg into a cocoon in less than twenty-four days, saving time and labor. However, the method did not produce the desired results.) By 1846 Castel Goffredo had three silk mills and four spinning wheels on its territory, representing the embryo of the future textile district.

== Contemporary age ==
Mazzinian conspirators

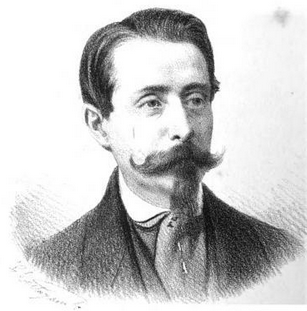
Giovanni Acerbi

During the uprisings of 1848 Castel Goffredo was the anti-Austrian conspiratorial center of Upper Mantua linked to the Belfiore martyrs and counted the presence of numerous patriots, headed by Giovanni Acerbi, who later became intendant of Garibaldi's Thousand.

They were: Alessandro Bertani, organist; Luciano Bertasi, barber; Luigi Betti, shoemaker; Ottaviano Bonfiglio, pharmacist; Claudio Casella, landowner; Carlo Cessi, owner of a café, grandfather of Anselmo Cessi; Domenico Fiorio, pharmacist; Luigi Gozzi, practicing notary; Giacomo Luzzardi, innkeeper; Luigi Pesci, municipal collector in Castiglione delle Stiviere; Anselmo Tommasi, landowner; Andrea Zanoni, farmer; Omero Zanucchi, landowner.

They were all arrested and tried in 1852 and released from prison in 1853 as a result of the amnesty. Giovanni Acerbi, who fled abroad, was convicted in absentia.

In the days before the Battle of Goito (May 30, 1848), Bartolomeo Riva's distinguished guest at Castel Goffredo was the Duke of Savoy Victor Emmanuel, future king of Italy. In the same year, aversion to the Austrian regime led to the establishment in Castel Goffredo of an underground group of Mazzinians, including Giovanni Acerbi and Omero Zanucchi, who was arrested along with twelve other townspeople. A municipal resolution for the installation of electric lighting, with the installation of lanterns, dates from 1848.

In 1859 the Austrian army, pressured by the Franco-Piedmontese, was forced to retreat toward the Mincio and the heights of Solferino, San Martino and Cavriana. Castel Goffredo was the scene of the Battle of Solferino and San Martino and saw the deployment of the French Third Army Corps under the command of General François Certain de Canrobert, headed with its men to Medole, where one of the bloodiest battles (Battle of Medole) was fought. On June 24, at 7 a.m., the fortress of Castel Goffredo, still occupied by an outpost of Austrian cavalry, was liberated by French General Pierre Hippolyte Publius Renault, supported by the men of General Jean-Pierre-François Jannin, who, by breaking down the wooden gate of the Porta di Sopra with the sappers, penetrated inside the town, freeing it from the enemies. The episode also had an important witness, the war envoy Charles Poplimont, who, during his stay, visited Castel Goffredo and was able to inquire directly about the history and the work there, and sent his newspaper a concise report. After the battle of Solferino, the hospital of Castel Goffredo helped the wounded who flocked there.

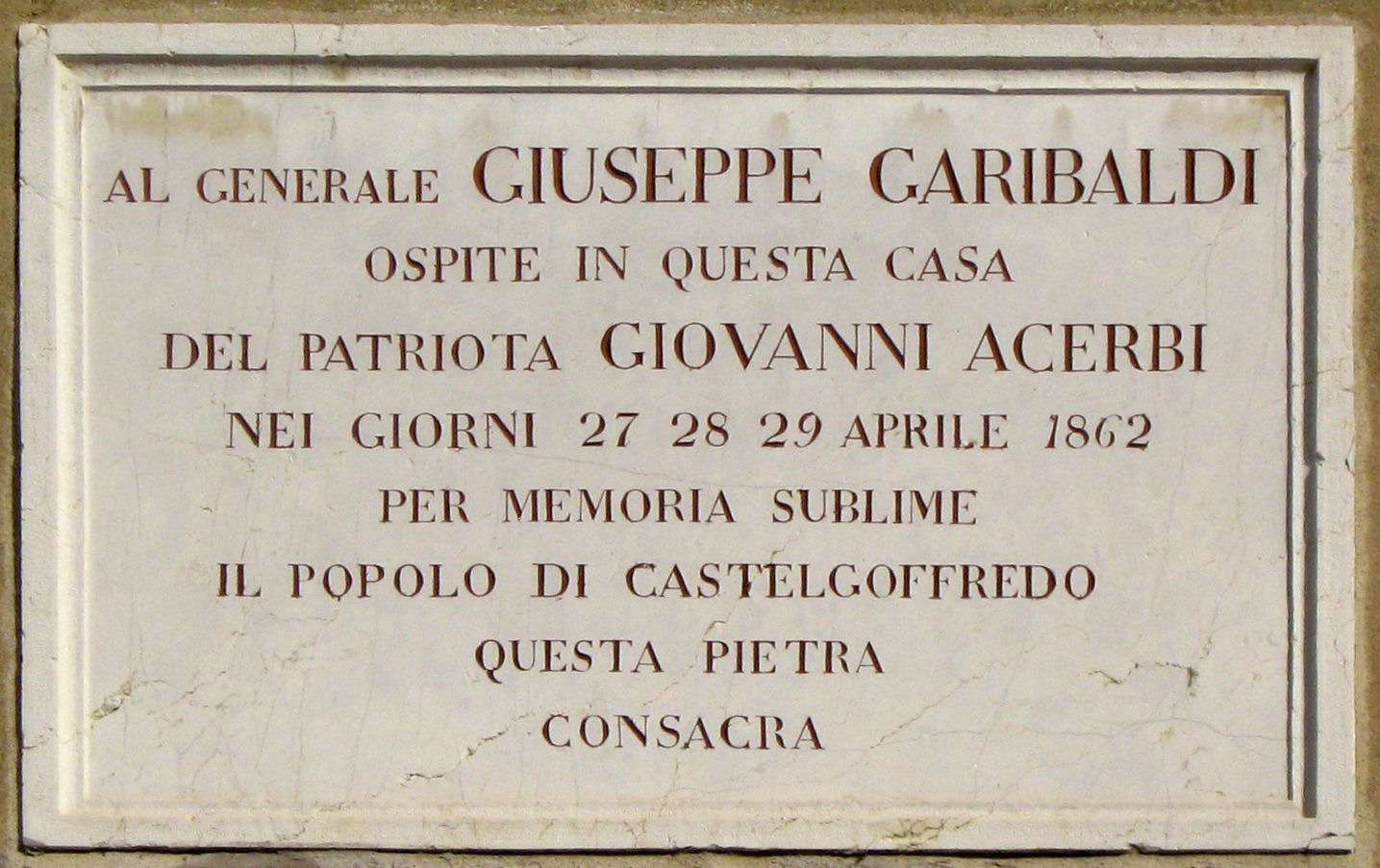
Tomb of Garibaldi, placed on the façade of the Gonzaga-Acerbi Palace.

Following the reorganization of the Italian provinces, in 1859 Castel Goffredo was included in the district of Castiglione delle Stiviere, Mandamento III of Asola, and a Carabinieri barracks was established there in December.

In the 1860s, a distinguished citizen of Castel Goffredo, Giovanni Acerbi, participated alongside Garibaldi in the First Expedition of the Thousand with the rank of Intendant General. It was during this period that the dismantling of the fortress-city began, giving way to the concept of an “open city,” without walls and fortifications. The city became part of the Kingdom of Italy in 1861 and lost in time the connotations of fortress-city, following the demolitions initiated in the eighteenth century, although it still retained intact three access gates and six towers. A market for cocoons and a public weighhouse were also built. On April 27, 28 and 29, 1862, Giuseppe Garibaldi (Note: Memorial plaque on Gonzaga-Acerbi Palace in Mazzini Square.) was a guest of the patriot Giovanni Acerbi and inaugurated the practice of target shooting in the town. In 1867, the municipality of Castel Goffredo decided to secede from the province of Brescia and to be part of the newly founded province of Mantua.

On January 1, 1871, the Workers' Mutual Aid Society was also established in Castel Goffredo, with the aim of making up for the shortcomings of the welfare state and thus helping workers. In 1872, the Castel Goffredo carnival, among the oldest in Italy, was established, centered on the figure of King Dumpling.

On November 28, 1895, the local rural bank was established, which had as its director the Catholic teacher Anselmo Cessi, who was assassinated in 1926.

=== The city of hosiery ===
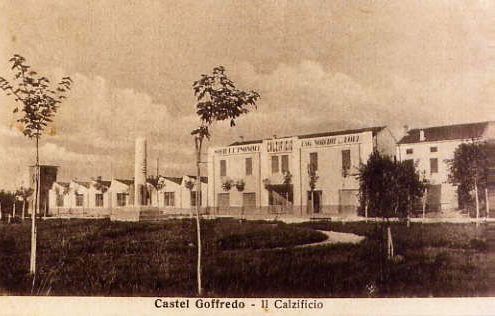
Castel Goffredo, NO.E.MI. hosiery factory in 1925-1930

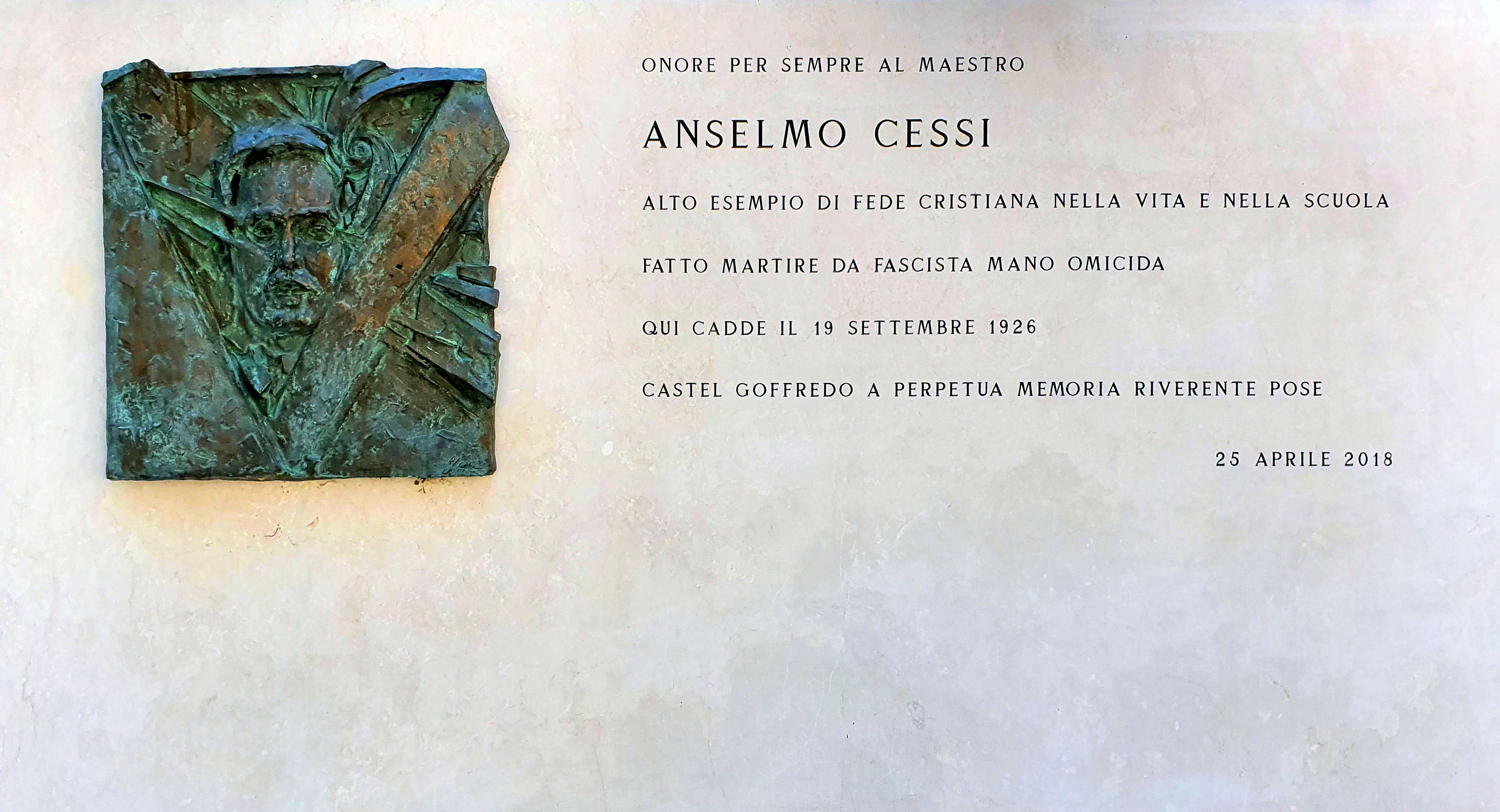
Monument to Anselmo Cessi

Between the 19th and 20th centuries began the process of industrialization of the town, which led Castel Goffredo to become the “hosiery capital.” The foundation stone was that of the company founded in 1925: the hosiery factory NO.E.MI. (initials of the founders' surnames), destined to mark the history of the local industry and economy, in two years came to employ 50 people.

On September 19, 1926, the Catholic teacher Anselmo Cessi was assassinated by the Fascists, and on the occasion of the Great Jubilee, John Paul II included him among the "martyrs of our time." In 2018, the Municipality of Castel Goffredo dedicated a monument to the teacher in the street of the same name, the work of the Mantuan sculptor Andrea Jori.

Between 1930 and 1933, Castel Goffredo benefited from the Medole-Casaloldo tramway, the purpose of which was to connect Desenzano and Lake Garda directly to Brescia, Mantua, Cremona and Piacenza: the line would allow the town to come out of its isolation.

After September 8, 1943, the Brigate Fiamme Verdi, partisan formations inspired by Don Primo Mazzolari, parish priest of Bozzolo, and dedicated, among other things, to opposing the Fascists, began to spread in some towns of the western Mantua area, including Castel Goffredo.

After World War II, Castel Goffredo experienced a great economic development, becoming an important industrial center for the textile industry, due to the substantial production of hosiery, tights and yarn; it is the seat of the textile industrial district number 6, composed of 15 municipalities from Mantua, Brescia and Cremona. (Note: The Castel Goffredo District covers the territory of three municipalities in the province of Brescia (Acquafredda, Remedello, Visano), one in the province of Cremona (Isola Dovarese) and eleven in the province of Mantua (Asola, Casalmoro, Casaloldo, Casalromano, Castel Goffredo, Castiglione delle Stiviere, Ceresara, Mariana Mantovana, Medole, Piubega, Solferino).)

Since 1987 it has been part of the “100 Municipalities of Little Big Italy.” In 1991, Castel Goffredo participated in the 22nd edition of the Games without Borders, held in Madrid, and came second. Since 1993, it has been twinned with Piran, with which it has consolidated several cultural exchanges.

It acquired the title of a city by the presidential decree of September 27, 2002.

== History of the coat of arms ==
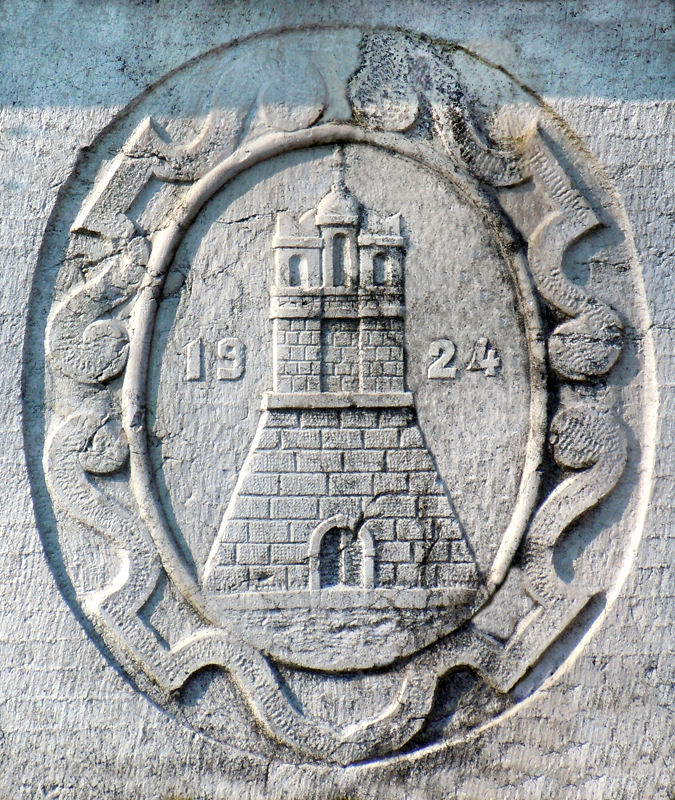
Municipal Coat of Arms on the Monument to the Fallen, 1924

Current coat of arms from 2003.

The oldest coat of arms, dated 1534, at the time of the Marquisate of Castel Goffredo, shows a "crenellated tower surmounted by a cross, with a gate and two windows" and around it the inscription Castel Guyfredo.

Dated 1681 is the emblem on the organ loft inside the Provostal Church of Sant'Erasmo. In 1688 a marble one, similar to the one mentioned above, was placed on the altar of the Crucifix in Sant'Erasmo. In 1725 it was embroidered on a cope kept in the same church. The representation of the coat of arms can also be seen in two documents of 1738 and 1779, kept in the Historical Archives of the Municipality, in which the towers are united and the Ghibelline battlements are grouped. In 1812 it appeared in the theater hall of the Town Hall, with a modification of the original coat of arms: the water of a moat was added and, in the early twentieth century, embellished with an unfurled flag.

== See also ==
- House of Gonzaga

== Bibliography ==
- AA.VV. (1858). L'istitutore, giornale pedagogico per le scuole infantili, elementari, reali e tecniche (in Italian). Venezia.
- Bolla, Margherita (2024). "Dissertationes Archaeologicae ex Instituto Archaeologico Universitatis de Rolando Eötvös nominatae". Proceedings of the XXIst International Congress on Ancient Bronzes (in English and Italian) (Supplementum 4). Budapest: David Bartus: 187–198. doi:10.17204/dissarch.suppl4.187. hdl:10831/112131. ISSN 2064-4574.
- Gualtierotti, Piero (2022). Le confessioni di un castellano (in Italian). Mantova: Publi Paolini. ISBN 979-12-81050-04-4.
- Amadei, Giuseppe; Marani, Ercolano (1975). I Gonzaga a Mantova (in Italian). Milano: Cassa di risparmio delle provincie lombarde.
- Arrighi, Cristiana (1998). Trame di seta. La genesi del distretto industriale di Castel Goffredo (in Italian). Mantova: Biblioteca comunale.
- Vespasiano Gonzaga e il ducato di Sabbioneta [atti del Convegno, Sabbioneta-Mantova, 12-13 ottobre 1991] (in Italian). Mantova: Accademia Virgiliana di Mantova. 1993.
- Berselli, Costante (1978). Castelgoffredo nella storia (in Italian). Mantova: Grafiche Sometti.
- Bertolotti, Antonino (1893). I comuni e le parrocchie della provincia mantovana (in Italian). Mantova.
- Bignami, Bruno (2014). Don Primo Mazzolari, parroco d'Italia (in Italian). Bologna. ISBN 978-88-10-96574-0.

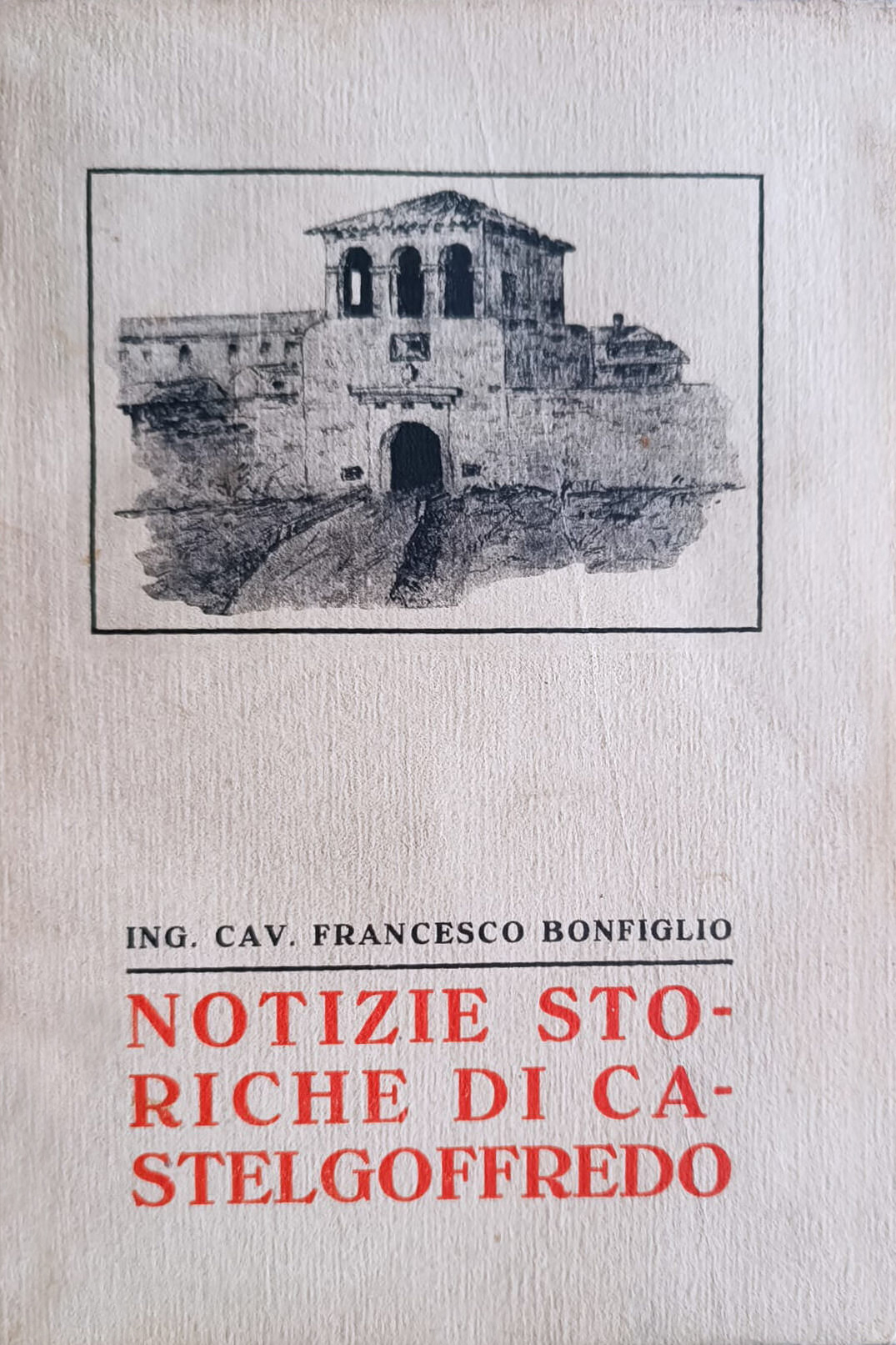
Cover of Historical news of Castel Goffredo by Francesco Bonfiglio, 1st edition, Brescia, 1922.

- Bonaglia, Renato (1985). Mantova, paese che vai... (in Italian). Mantova.
- Bonfiglio, Francesco (1925). Appendice alle notizie storiche di Castel Goffredo (in Italian). Asola: Tipografia Scalini e Carrara.
- Bonfiglio, Francesco (2005). Notizie storiche di Castelgoffredo (in Italian). Mantova: Sometti. ISBN 88-7495-163-9.
- Boriani, Enzo (1969). Castelli e torri dei Gonzaga nel territorio mantovano (in Italian). Brescia: F. Apollonio.
- Cantù, Cesare (1854). La Lombardia nel secolo XVII (in Italian). Milano: Volpato e Comp.
- Comune di Castel Goffredo (1999). Vivi la città. Comune di Castel Goffredo (in Italian). Reggio Emilia: Gruppo Media.
- Cavazzoli, Luigi (1995). Guerra e Resistenza. Mantova 1940-1945 (in Italian). Mantova.
- Giancarlo Ciaramelli (2005). Tipografi, editori e librai mantovani dell'Ottocento (in Italian). Milano: Franco Angeli.
- Cobelli, Giancarlo (1995). Archivio storico di Castel Goffredo: inventario della sezione anteriore al 1870 (in Italian). Canneto sull'Oglio: CRA Castel Goffredo.
- Coniglio, Giuseppe (1973). I Gonzaga (in Italian). Varese: Dall'Oglio.
- Ferro, Tullio (2004). Le colline dei Gonzaga (in Italian). Mantova: Editoriale Sometti. ISBN 88-7495-101-9.
- Gozzi, Carlo (2000). Raccolta di documenti per la Storia di Castelgoffredo e biografia di que' principi Gonzaga che l'hanno governato personalmente (1840) (in Italian). Mantova: Editoriale Sometti. ISBN 88-88091-11-4.
- Gozzi, Carlo (2001). Raccolta di documenti per la storia patria od Effemeridi storiche patrie (in Italian). Vol. 1. Mantova: Editoriale Sometti.
- Gualtieri, Luigi (2009). Il Socialismo tra mito e storia (in Italian). Milano: M & B Publishing. ISBN 978-88-7451-077-1.
- Gualtierotti, Piero (1979). Le sperimentazioni agricole di Giuseppe Acerbi (in Italian). Castel Goffredo: Tipografia Bizzi.
- Gualtierotti, Piero (1978). Matteo Bandello alla corte di Luigi Gonzaga (in Italian). Mantova: Edizioni VITAM.
- Gualtierotti, Piero (1976). Pietro Aretino, Luigi Gonzaga e la Corte di Castel Goffredo (in Italian). Mantova.
- Gualtierotti, Piero (2008). Castel Goffredo dalle origini ai Gonzaga (in Italian). Mantova: Grafiche Grassi.
- Gualtierotti, Piero (2017). Castel Goffredo dalla civiltà contadina all'era industriale (1848-1900) (in Italian). Mantova: Publi Paolini. ISBN 978-88-95490-87-8.
- Guerrini, Paolo (1940). Atti della visita pastorale del vescovo Domenico Bollani alla diocesi di Brescia (in Italian). Brescia.
- Lombardi, Paolo (1986). ...Ma le calze (in Italian). Milano: Idealibri. ISBN 88-7082-051-3.
- Mangini, Lodovico (1999). Historie di Asola, fortezza posta tra gli confini del ducato di Mantova, Brescia e Cremona. Vol. I (in Italian). Mantova: G. Arcari.
- Marocchi, Massimo (1990). I Gonzaga di Castiglione delle Stiviere. Vicende pubbliche e private del casato di San Luigi (in Italian). Verona: Artegrafica.
- Museo Civico Remedello (1985). Museo e territorio. La bassa orientale (in Italian). Asola: Campanini & Carrara.
- Roggero Roggeri (2008). Gonzaga delle nebbie. Storia di una dinastia cadetta nelle terre tra Oglio e Po (in Italian). Cinisello Balsamo: Silvana Editoriale.
- Salvarani, Renata (2008). Matilde di Canossa, il papato, l'impero: storia, arte, cultura alle origini del romanico (in Italian). Cinisello Balsamo: Silvana Editoriale. ISBN 978-88-366-1110-2.
- Sarzi Amadè, Luca (2019). I Gonzaga: una dinastia tra Medioevo e Rinascimento (in Italian). Bari: Laterza. ISBN 978-88-581-3971-4.
- Scardovelli, Giovanni (1890). Luigi, Alfonso e Rodolfo Gonzaga marchesi di Castelgoffredo (in Italian). Bologna: Stabilimento Tipografico Zamorani e Albertazzi.
- Sommi, Guido (1864). Castel Goffredo e i Gonzaga (in Italian). Milano: Tipografia Lombardi.
- Tabai, Lisa; Telò, Massimo; Milazzo, Alfio (2020). Appunti d'arte. Conversazioni sugli affreschi di Palazzo Gonzaga-Acerbi (in Italian). Viterbo: Press Up.
- Telò, Giovanni (1987). Chiesa e fascismo in una provincia rossa. Mantova 1919-1928 (in Italian). Mantova: Publi Paolini.
- Telò, Giovanni (2000). Con la lucerna accesa. Vita e assassinio del maestro mantovano Anselmo Cessi (1877-1926) (in Italian). Mantova: Tipografia Grassi.
- Telò, Giovanni (1992). San Michele & dintorni (in Italian). Mantova: Publi Paolini.
- Giovanni Telò (2 November 2023). "Banche per "gli ultimi". Le Casse rurali mantovane e quella di Bozzolo dalla Rerum novarum al fascismo". Impegno - Rivista della Fondazione don Primo Mazzolari ONLUS (in Italian). 34 (2): 9–34.
- Telò, Massimo (2021). Aloisio Gonzaga. Un principe nella Castel Goffredo del '500 (in Italian). Roma: PressUp.
- Togliani, Carlo (2009). Il principe e l'eremita (in Italian). Mantova: Sometti. ISBN 978-88-7495-327-1.
- TCI (1999). Lombardia. Guida d'Italia (esclusa Milano) (in Italian). Milano. [ISBN unspecified].
- Tozzi, Pierluigi (1972). Storia padana antica (in Italian). Milano: Casa Editrice Ceschina.
- Vigna, Guido (2016). Storia di Mantova. Da Manto a capitale della cultura (in Italian). Venezia: Marsilio. ISBN 978-88-317-2437-1.
- Vignoli, Mariano (1998). Quanta schiera di gagliardi. Uomini e cose del Risorgimento nell'alto mantovano (in Italian). Mantova: Publi Paolini.
- Vignoli, Mariano (2010). Da terra aperta e ben intesa fortezza. Le mura e le fortificazioni di Castel Goffredo (in Italian). Mantova: Publi Paolini. ISBN 978-88-95490-10-6.
- Zoppè, Leandro (1988). Itinerari gonzagheschi (in Italian). Milano: Itinera Edizioni. ISBN 88-85462-10-3.
