= Gazoldo degli Ippoliti =

- Comune
- Comune di Gazoldo degli Ippoliti
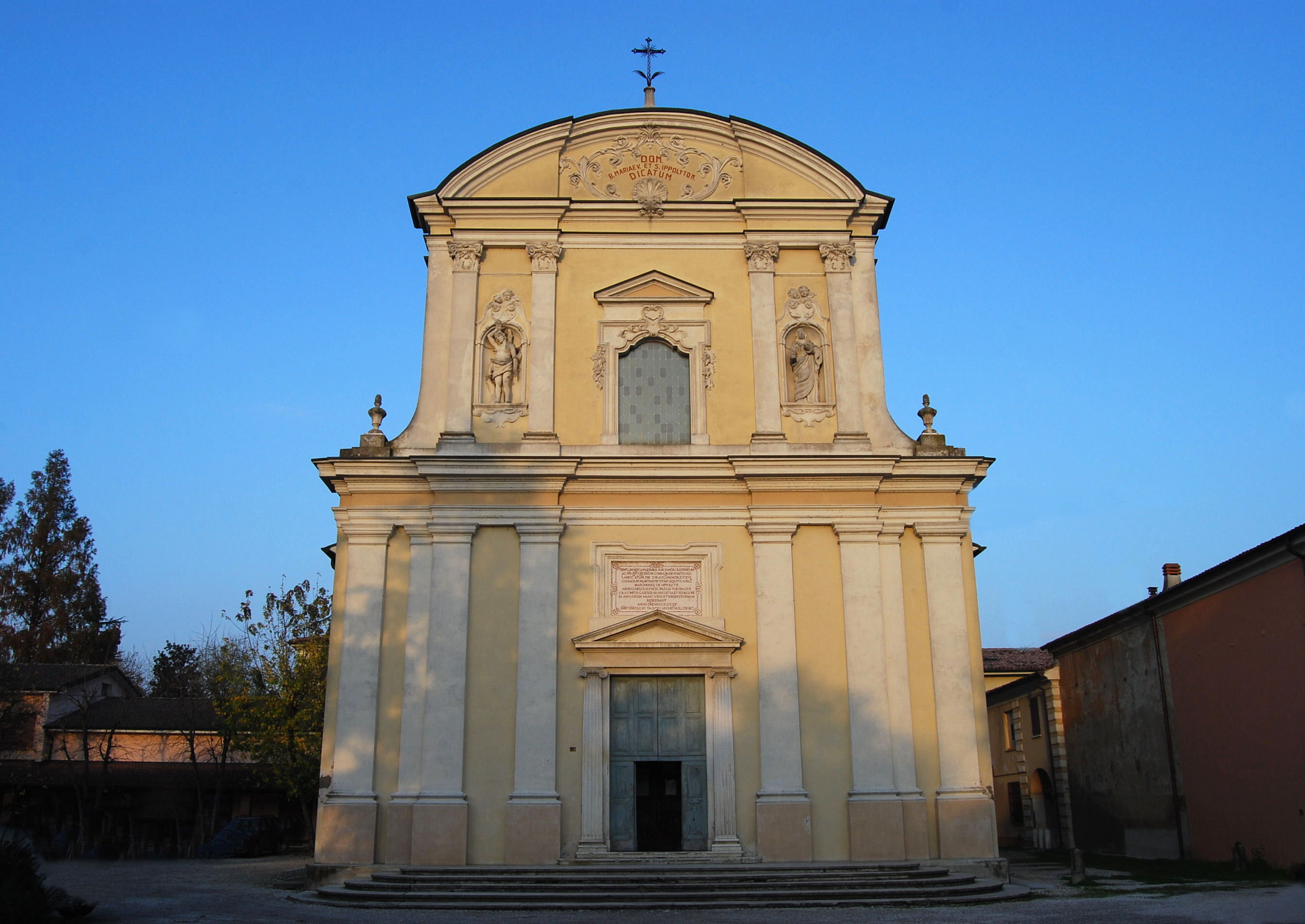

- Coat of arms

- Location within Italy Location within Lombardy
- Coordinates: 45°12′N 10°35′E
- Country: Italy
- Region: Lombardy
- Province: Mantua (MN)
- Frazioni: San Fermo

Government
  - Mayor: Nicola Leoni

Area
  - Total: 12.9 km^{2} (5.0 sq mi)

Population (2007)
  - Total: 2,574
  - Density: 200/km^{2} (517/sq mi)
- Demonym: Gazoldesi
- Time zone: UTC+1 (CET)
  - Summer (DST): UTC+2 (CEST)
- Postal code: 46040
- Dialing code: 0376
- Website: Official website

Gazoldo degli Ippoliti (Upper Mantovano: Gasolt) is a comune (municipality) in the Province of Mantua in the Italian region Lombardy, located about 110 kilometres (68 mi) east of Milan and about 15 kilometres (9 mi) west of Mantua.

== Geography ==
Gazoldo is located in the Po Valley between the Oglio and Mincio rivers; it is 20 km from Mantua, its provincial capital. The neighboring municipalities are: Castellucchio to the southeast, Ceresara to the north, Marcaria to the south, Piubega to the west, Redondesco to the southwest, and Rodigo to the northeast. The municipality has an average altitude of 34 m a.s.l. and an area of 12.9 km^{2} (5.0 sq mi) including the hamlet of San Fermo (known for its peculiar subdivision under 3 different municipalities).

There are only 2 access routes to Gazoldo: access from Piubega to the west via Provincial Road 1, and from the north and south via the famous Roman route, Via Postumia. Also of note is the Gazoldo Museum of Modern Art, based in one of the stately 16th-century residences of the local feudal lords, Villa Ippoliti (at 126 Via Marconi) founded in 1980.

== History ==
=== Origins and Toponym ===
Gazoldo's proximity to an important Roman road, the Via Postumia, suggests the existence, if not exactly of a built-up area – vicus -, at least of a statio – a stopping and changing place for travellers – in Roman times, although it remains in the realm of conjecture due to the almost complete lack of concrete evidence.

It is known for certain that Gazoldo and its territory were part of the conquest of Mantua in the 1st century BC. In fact, Virgil's lament Mantua vae miserae nimium vicina Cremonae recalls the fate that befell Mantua, which saw part of its best lands apportioned among Augustus' veterans due to the proximity of Cremona, whose territories, confiscated for its demeanor during the Modena War, were insufficient to compensate for the expectations of the numerous assignees.

Archaeological evidence is also scarce; for example, near Gazoldo, Roman coins have been found, and the only remains and traces of human habitation are concreted in a Roman monry.

More likely, because it is attested at least etymologically, is the Germanic origin of Gazoldo.

The etymon, like many other toponyms in the Lombard area, may in fact derive from the Lombard term gahagium in the meaning of "girdled, enclosed forest"; it can be assumed that the term underwent the transformation into gahaio, gagium, and note the corruption of the Germanic term into the Latin godium or gazium.

Gazzi would thus be enclosed estates, land-girded according to the Lombard land system; the Germanic equivalent of the Roman curtes, consisting not only of woods but also of a complex of lands and waters, forming the economic-legal unit known as "court" or "villa" in the lower Roman empire.

The termination -olt would be but a corruption of the Latin adjective altum into oltum, so Gazoldo etymologically would mean "high banished forest," an active economic center of self-sufficient production.

According to Navarrini, the hypothesis of Gazoldo's Germanic origin leads to the assumption of a permanence in the territory of a Lombard ethnic substratum that maintained its customs and traditions, which would explain the land-lord relationship around the 10th–11th centuries.

=== The Middle Ages ===
The beginning of a jurisdictional autonomy of the territory can presumably be placed chronologically around the middle of the 10th century, when the weakening of the central power due to the existing rivalry between the pretenders to the Regnum Italiae, the direct descent from the Carolingians having disappeared, the gradual disenfranchisement of the count in the comital districts, a consequence of the alienations of state endowments in favor of bishops and cities, and the invasion of the Hungarians, which caused the encastellation of many towns in the countryside, are reasons for the decay of the ancient forms of public organization and the change towards new territorial units.

In this period, new bodies, curtes and castra, developed as a result of the gradual disappearance of circumscriptions endowed with public functions, a phenomenon that would trigger a profound transformation and initiate the dispersion of powers and the fractionalization of sovereignty, leading to the formation of those new bodies that would call upon the exercise of jurisdictional powers.

Gazoldo, in the oldest document in which it is first mentioned, is said to belong to the Mantuan territory; this can be read in the Liber Potheris of the municipality of Brescia, in which relatively to the year 1215 twice funds lying ad Gazoltum in Mantuana are described.

The Liber Potheris of Brescia represents a valuable testimony to the politico-military action of the city communes against the rural potentates, aimed at the progressive elimination of any remaining center of power and the full establishment of communal hegemony over the territory.

Recorded in the Liber Potheris are the pacts and transactions through which the rural lords gradually became conglobated in city society, just as with a similar action happened in the Mantuan territory, where, however, the phenomenon had less conspicuous forms.

This process, which was completed over the 13th century, seems not to have escaped the Gazoldo territory, even if precise mention of it is not found in the transactions between the municipality of Brescia and the Ugonidi counts, to whom Gazoldo, at least in part, belonged.

The belonging of this place to the legal sphere of those counts, particularly those of the Mosio branch, is historically proven: in two documents the correlation between Count Rogerio of Mosio, who lived around the middle of the 13th century, and the villa of Gazoldo appears clear. A legally unspecifiable relationship, but one that can be framed in the powers of lordship exercised pro indiviso in the territory of the so-called "Committee," to which Gazoldo too, albeit partially, would seem to have access.

Gazoldo's belonging to Mantua, at least in the communal age, is confirmed by the 13th-century statutes of the commune of Mantua, known as the Bonacolsian Statutes, where, in determining the distances of the villages subject to the city's jurisdiction, Gazoldo is placed in the Mantuan orbit, ten miles away from the major district of Santo Stefano to which it belonged administratively.

Another singularity of the villa of Gazoldo is that in all the acts referring to the territory its boundaries are given as acquired; in the same imperial diplomas the only territorial specification turns out to be that of its position between the districts of Brescia and Mantua and the pertinence of an undivided part of the forest of Redondesco.

One fact, however, is certain, according to Navarrini's investigation at least: in the 13th century a geographical identity of the villa was already assumed to be configured, to which a juridical identity could not also be separated.

To summarize, the first historical information about Gazoldo thus dates back to the beginning of the 13th century, in an act of verification of the feudal possessions of the commune of Brescia in the neighboring curiae comitali of Mariana Mantovana and Redondesco. Gazoldo's belonging to the Mantuan district seems confirmed by the Bonacolsian Statutes. A Mantuan land then, but included in the legal sphere of the Ugonid counts.

Gazoldo was, however, a definite territorial entity, even within the possessions of Count Rogerio of Mosio, a court encompassing not only economic autonomy but also administrative autonomy.

The transfer of possession of Gazoldo from the family of the Counts of Mosio to that of the Bonacolsi and from them to the Ippoliti took place by female means, following the marriage in 1305 of Felicina dei Bonacolsi to Albertino Ippoliti.

On 20 December 1354, Emperor Charles IV of Bohemia granted Albertino Ippoliti the feudal investiture of the villa and its appurtenances, recognizing him with the condolence title. Gazoldo's direct reliance on the empire shielded him from the Gonzaga's potential goals.

== Culture ==
=== Museums and galleries ===
- Gazoldo degli Ippoliti Wax Museum

== Economy ==
Of importance to Gazoldo's economy is the presence of Marcegaglia s.p.a., a leading steel processing and steel rolling company with a market that develops worldwide and production facilities present in Argentina and Eastern Europe.

== Infrastructure and transportation ==
Gazoldo is crossed by the routes of provincial roads SP1 (Mantova Asola ) and SP17 (the ancient Via Postumia ). The connecting service to Mantua consists of bus routes run by the APAM; in the past, between 1886 and 1933, a station was active along the Mantova-Asola tramway.
