= Alvaro Superchi =

Italian politician (1944–2025)

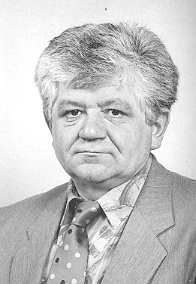
- Superchi in 1994

Member of the Chamber of Deputies of Italy
- In office 15 April 1994 – 8 May 1996

Personal details
- Born: 3 April 1944 (age 82) Marcaria, Italy
- Party: PDS
- Occupation: Factory worker

Alvaro Superchi (born 3 April 1944) is an Italian politician. A member of the Democratic Party of the Left, he served in the Chamber of Deputies from 1994 to 1996.

== Biography ==
An Alfa Romeo factory worker and active union member, he was elected to the Chamber of Deputies with the Democratic Party of the Left in the 1994 general election, following the allocation of seats among the candidates elected in multiple constituencies. He ran again for the Olive Tree coalition in the subsequent 1996 general election, in the Milan 10 constituency, but was defeated by Gabriele Cimadoro, the candidate of the Freedom Pole.

After retiring from his job as a factory worker, he continued his union activism with the Milan branch of the Italian General Confederation of Labour and with Auser.
