= Gazoldo degli Ippoliti Wax Museum =

- Established: 2000 (26 years ago)
- Location: Via Marconi 13, Gazoldo degli Ippoliti, province of Mantua, Italy
- Coordinates: 45.198866°N 10.580626°E
- Website: cultura.gov.it/luogo/museo-delle-cere-di-gazoldo-degli-ippoliti

Gazoldo degli Ippoliti Wax Museum is a wax museum located in Gazoldo degli Ippoliti, province of Mantua, Italy.

== History ==
The wax museum was founded following the closure of the wax museum at Milano Centrale railway station in 2000 and found a new home in the Gazoldo degli Ippoliti municipality.

The exhibition, housed in the Rocca Palatina, features 80 life-size wax figures representing historical, religious, political, and cinematic figures, displayed in settings with sound and lighting effects.
