= Rodigo =

Rodigo Ròdech (Emilian)
- Comune
- Comune di Rodigo
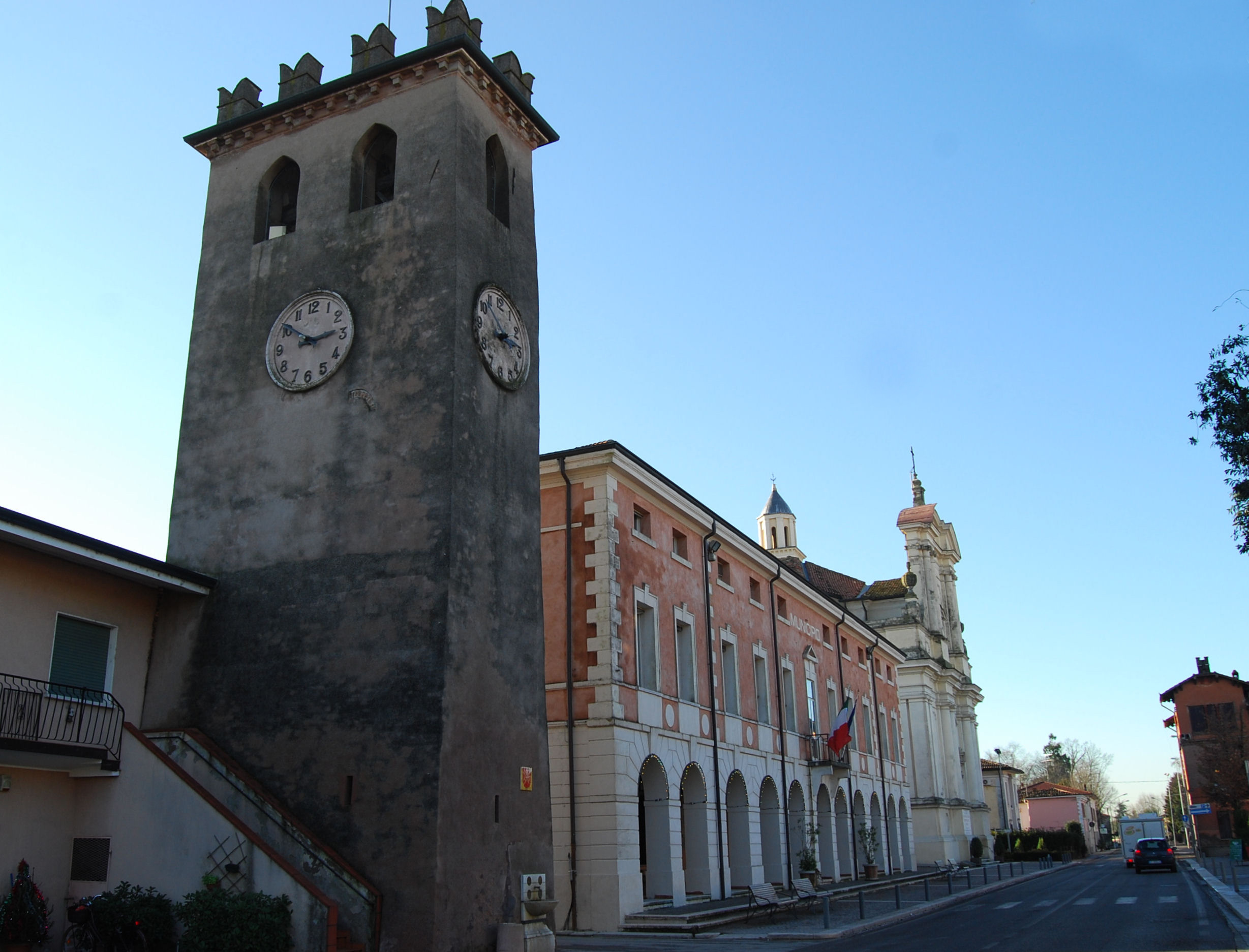

- Coat of arms

- Location within Italy Location within Lombardy
- Coordinates: 45°12′N 10°38′E
- Country: Italy
- Region: Lombardy
- Province: Mantua (MN)
- Frazioni: Fossato, Rivalta sul Mincio

Government
  - Mayor: Gianni Chizzoni (Lega Nord)

Area
  - Total: 41.6 km^{2} (16.1 sq mi)
- Elevation: 31 m (102 ft)

Population (1 January 2009)
  - Total: 5,407
  - Density: 130/km^{2} (337/sq mi)
- Demonym: Rodighesi
- Time zone: UTC+1 (CET)
  - Summer (DST): UTC+2 (CEST)
- Postal code: 46040
- Dialing code: 0376
- Website: Official website

Rodigo (Upper Mantovano: Ròdech) is a comune (municipality) in the Province of Mantua in the Italian region Lombardy, located about 120 kilometres (75 mi) east of Milan and about 14 kilometres (9 mi) northwest of Mantua.

Rodigo borders the following municipalities: Castellucchio, Ceresara, Curtatone, Gazoldo degli Ippoliti, Goito, Porto Mantovano.

== Twin towns ==
- Berg, Germany, since 2004
