= Piubega =

Piubega Piübega (Emilian)
- Comune
- Comune di Piubega
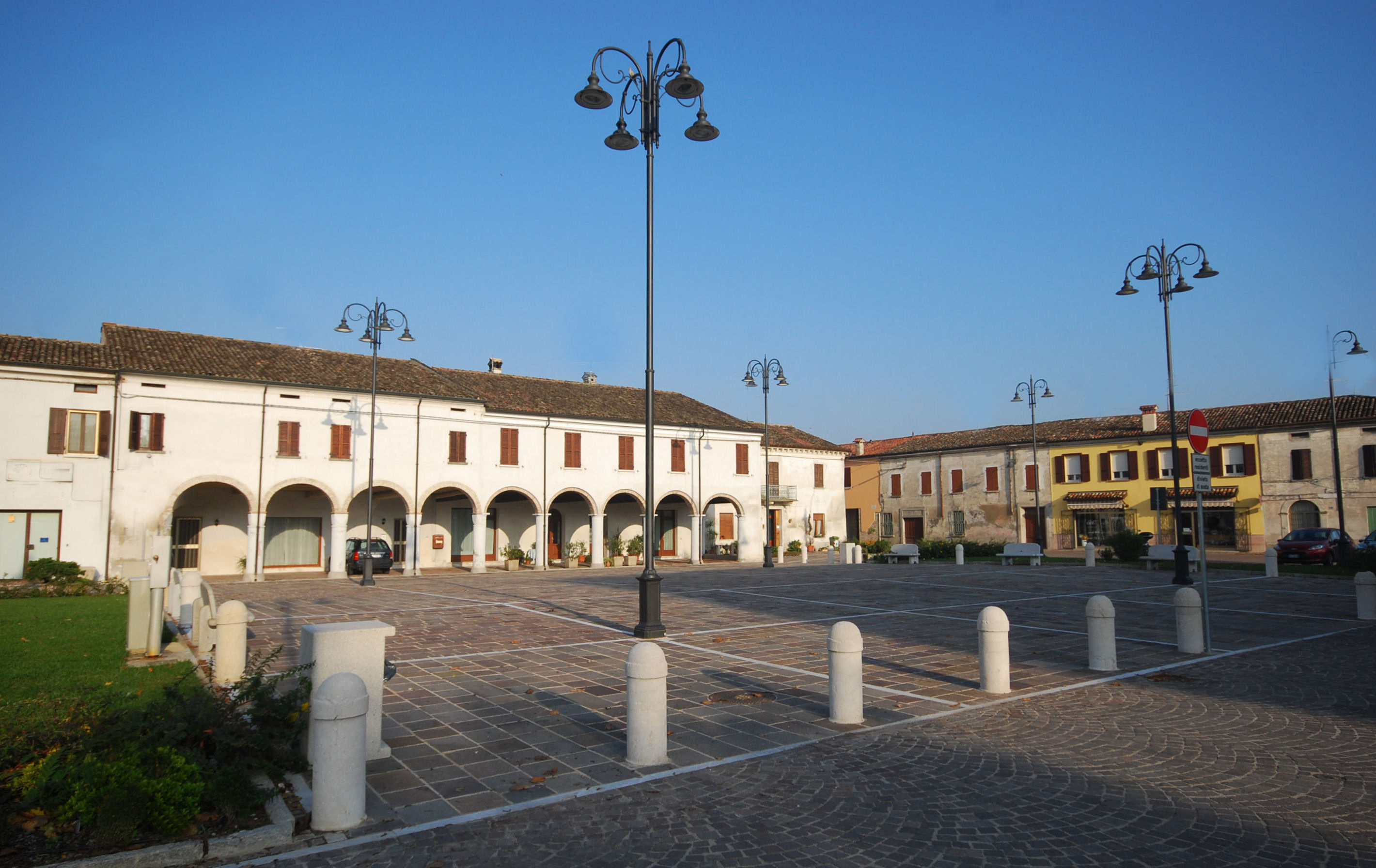

- Location within Italy Location within Lombardy
- Coordinates: 45°14′N 10°32′E
- Country: Italy
- Region: Lombardy
- Province: Province of Mantua (MN)

Area
  - Total: 16.4 km^{2} (6.3 sq mi)

Population (Dec. 2004)
  - Total: 1,722
  - Density: 105/km^{2} (272/sq mi)
- Time zone: UTC+1 (CET)
  - Summer (DST): UTC+2 (CEST)
- Postal code: 46040
- Dialing code: 0376

Piubega (Upper Mantovano: Piübega) is a comune (municipality) in the Province of Mantua in the Italian region Lombardy, located about 110 kilometres (68 mi) east of Milan and about 20 kilometres (12 mi) northwest of Mantua. As of 31 December 2004, it had a population of 1,722 and an area of 16.4 square kilometres (6.3 mi^{2}).

Piubega borders the following municipalities: Asola, Casaloldo, Ceresara, Gazoldo degli Ippoliti, Mariana Mantovana, Redondesco.

== Demographic evolution ==
Historical population

Year	Pop.	±%
1861	1,372	—
1871	1,555	+13.3%
1881	1,617	+4.0%
1901	1,927	+19.2%
1911	2,335	+21.2%

Year	Pop.	±%
1921	2,525	+8.1%
1931	2,514	−0.4%
1936	2,426	−3.5%
1951	2,534	+4.5%
1961	2,055	−18.9%

Year	Pop.	±%
1971	1,733	−15.7%
1981	1,729	−0.2%
1991	1,640	−5.1%
2001	1,630	−0.6%

Source: Data from ISTAT
