= Redondesco =

Redondesco Redundèsch (Emilian)
- Comune
- Comune di Redondesco
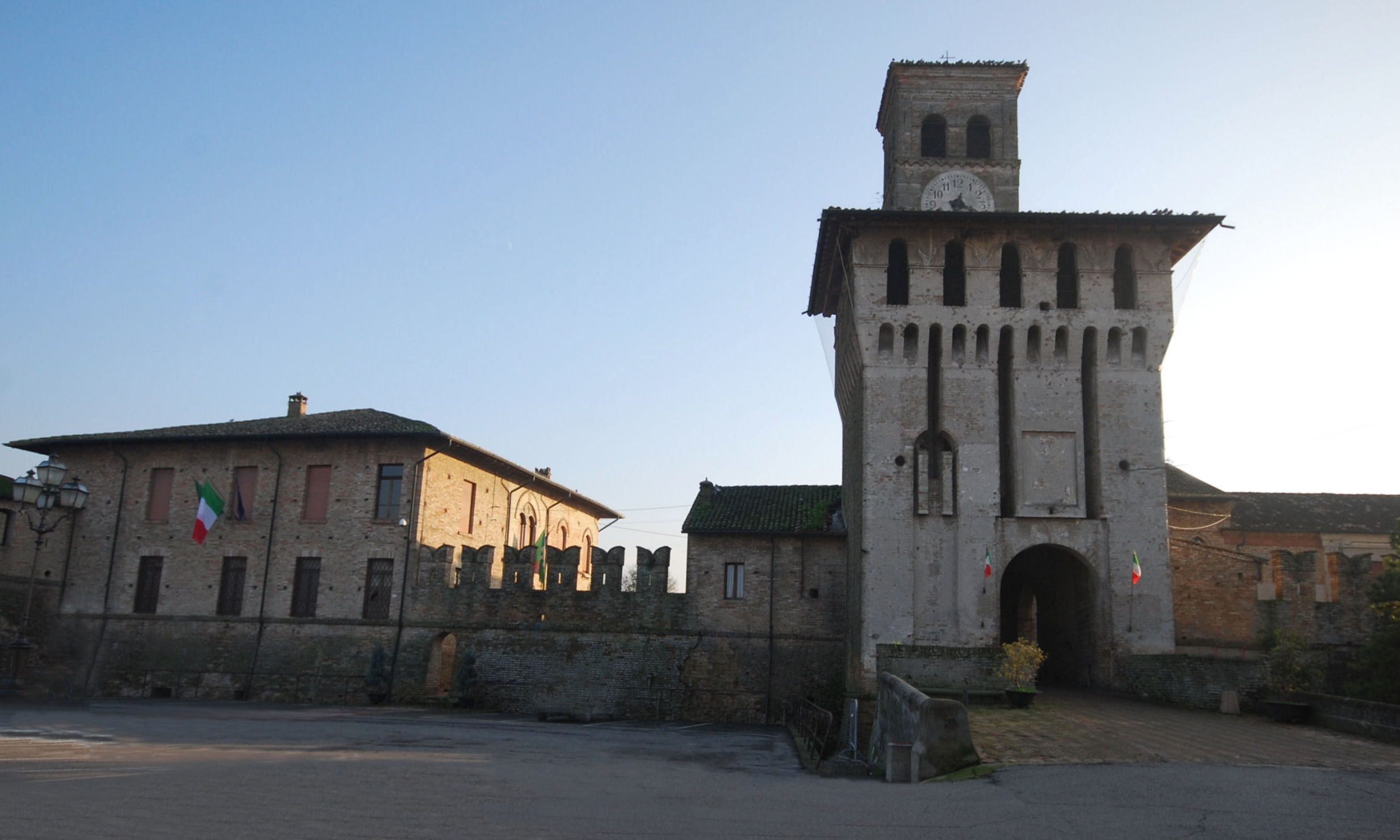

- Location within Italy Location within Lombardy
- Coordinates: 45°10′N 10°31′E
- Country: Italy
- Region: Lombardy
- Province: Province of Mantua (MN)
- Frazioni: Bologne

Area
  - Total: 19.1 km^{2} (7.4 sq mi)

Population (Dec. 2004)
  - Total: 1,378
  - Density: 72.1/km^{2} (187/sq mi)
- Time zone: UTC+1 (CET)
  - Summer (DST): UTC+2 (CEST)
- Postal code: 46010
- Dialing code: 0376

Redondesco (Upper Mantovano: Redundèsch) is a comune (municipality) in the Province of Mantua in the Italian region Lombardy, located about 110 kilometres (68 mi) southeast of Milan and about 20 kilometres (12 mi) west of Mantua. As of 31 December 2004, it had a population of 1,378 and an area of 19.1 square kilometres (7.4 mi^{2}).

The municipality of Redondesco contains the frazione (subdivision) Bologne.

Redondesco borders the following municipalities: Acquanegra sul Chiese, Gazoldo degli Ippoliti, Marcaria, Mariana Mantovana, Piubega.

== Demographic evolution ==
Historical population

| Year | Pop. | ±% |
|---|---|---|
| 1861 | 1,980 | — |
| 1871 | 2,020 | +2.0% |
| 1881 | 2,076 | +2.8% |
| 1901 | 2,062 | −0.7% |
| 1911 | 2,186 | +6.0% |

| Year | Pop. | ±% |
|---|---|---|
| 1921 | 2,311 | +5.7% |
| 1931 | 2,534 | +9.6% |
| 1936 | 2,574 | +1.6% |
| 1951 | 2,468 | −4.1% |
| 1961 | 2,048 | −17.0% |

| Year | Pop. | ±% |
|---|---|---|
| 1971 | 1,750 | −14.6% |
| 1981 | 1,571 | −10.2% |
| 1991 | 1,424 | −9.4% |
| 2001 | 1,387 | −2.6% |

Source: Data from ISTAT
