= Acquanegra sul Chiese =

- Comune
- Comune di Acquanegra sul Chiese
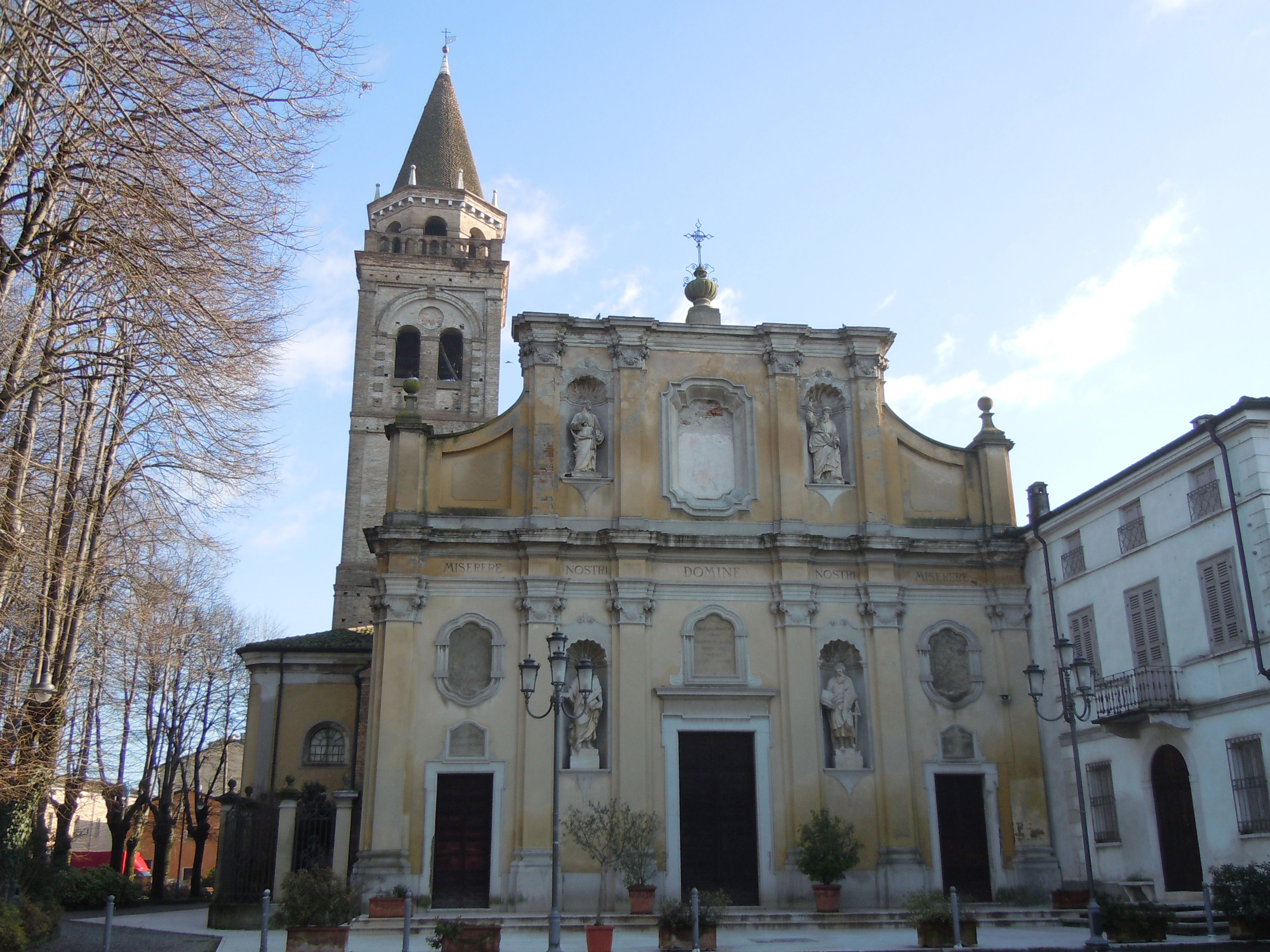
- Church of S. Tommaso, Acquanegra sul Chiese

- Coat of arms

- Location of Acquanegra sul Chiese in Italy Acquanegra sul Chiese (Lombardy)
- Coordinates: 45°10′N 10°26′E
- Country: Italy
- Region: Lombardy
- Province: Mantua (MN)
- Frazioni: Mosio

Government
  - Mayor: Monica De Pieri

Area
  - Total: 28.3 km^{2} (10.9 sq mi)
- Elevation: 31 m (102 ft)

Population (28 February 2017)
  - Total: 2,931
  - Density: 104/km^{2} (268/sq mi)
- Demonym: Acquanegresi
- Time zone: UTC+1 (CET)
  - Summer (DST): UTC+2 (CEST)
- Postal code: 46011
- Dialing code: 0376

Acquanegra sul Chiese (Mantovano: 'Quanégra) is a comune (municipality) in the Province of Mantua in the Italian region Lombardy, located about 100 kilometres (62 mi) southeast of Milan and about 30 kilometres (19 mi) west of Mantua.

Acquanegra sul Chiese borders the following municipalities: Asola, Bozzolo, Calvatone, Canneto sull'Oglio, Marcaria, Mariana Mantovana, Redondesco.
