= Marcaria =

- Comune
- Comune di Marcaria
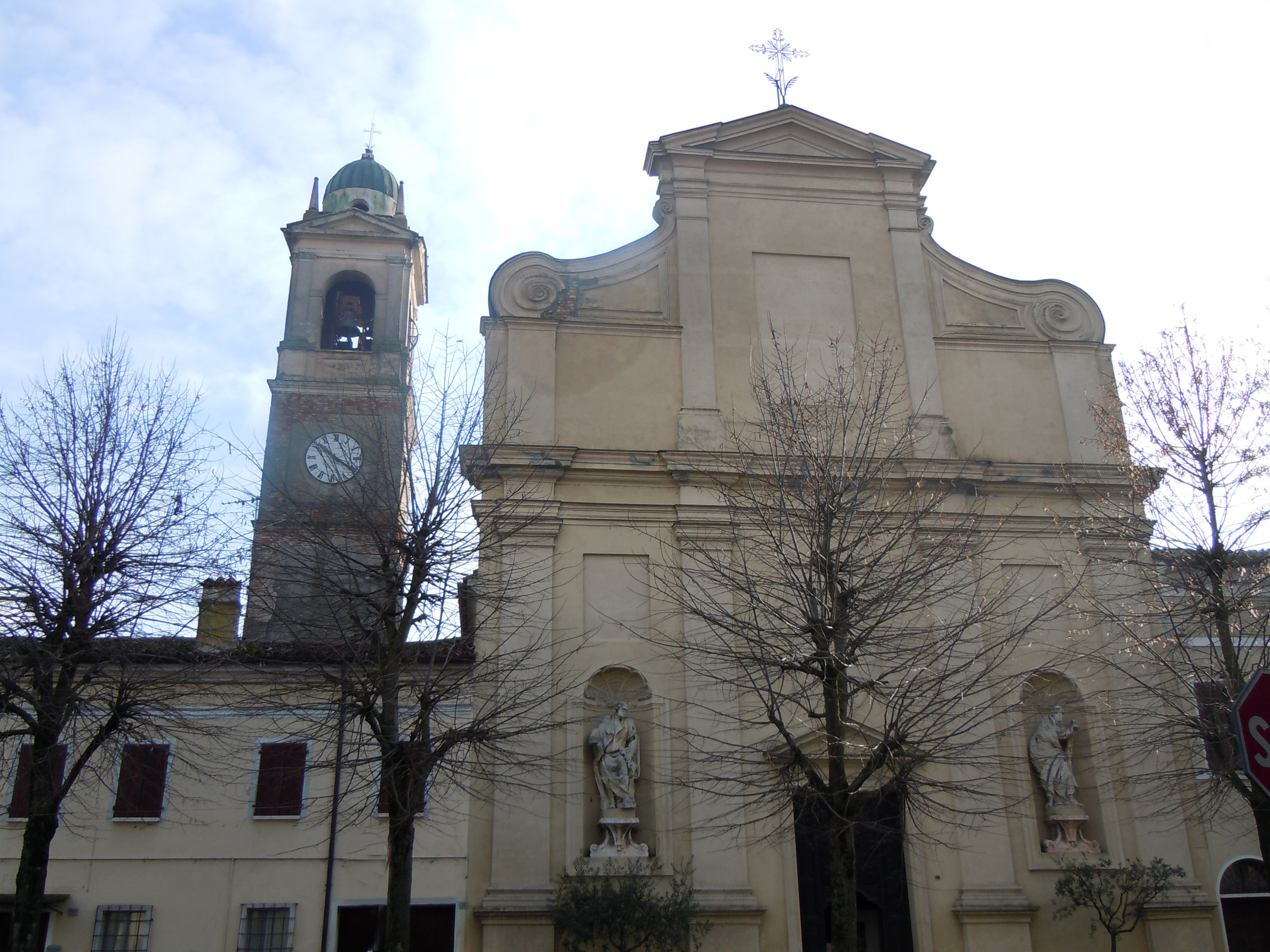

- Coat of arms

- Location within Italy Location within Lombardy
- Coordinates: 45°7′N 10°32′E
- Country: Italy
- Region: Lombardy
- Province: Mantua (MN)
- Frazioni: Campitello, Canicossa, Casatico, Casazze, Cesole, Cimbriolo, Gabbiana, Ospitaletto Mantovano, Pilastro, San Michele in Bosco

Government
  - Mayor: Carlo Alberto Malatesta

Area
  - Total: 89.79 km^{2} (34.67 sq mi)
- Elevation: 25 m (82 ft)

Population (31 28 February 2017)
  - Total: 6,630
  - Density: 73.8/km^{2} (191/sq mi)
- Demonym: Marcariesi
- Time zone: UTC+1 (CET)
  - Summer (DST): UTC+2 (CEST)
- Postal code: 46010
- Dialing code: 0376
- Website: Official website

Marcaria is a comune (municipality) in the Province of Mantua in the Italian region Lombardy, located about 110 kilometres (68 mi) southeast of Milan and about 20 kilometres (12 mi) west of Mantua.

Marcaria borders the following municipalities: Acquanegra sul Chiese, Borgo Virgilio, Bozzolo, Castellucchio, Curtatone, Gazoldo degli Ippoliti, Gazzuolo, Redondesco, San Martino dall'Argine, Viadana.

The Renaissance writer Baldassarre Castiglione was born at Casatico in 1478.
