= Casalmoro =

Casalmoro Casalmor (Emilian)
- Comune
- Comune di Casalmoro
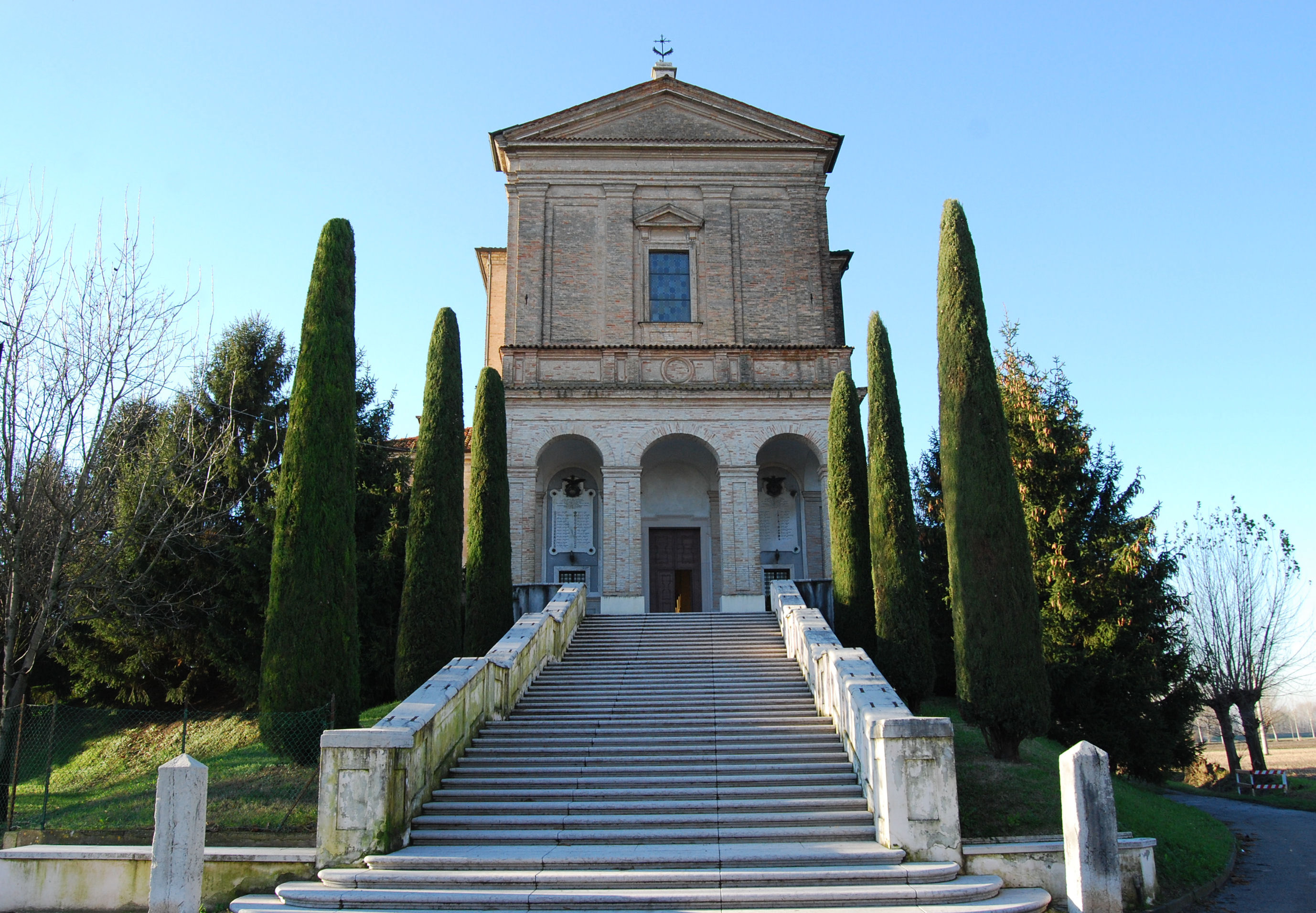

- Location within Italy Location within Lombardy
- Coordinates: 45°16′N 10°24′E
- Country: Italy
- Region: Lombardy
- Province: Province of Mantua (MN)

Area
  - Total: 13.9 km^{2} (5.4 sq mi)

Population (Dec. 2004)
  - Total: 2,228
  - Density: 160/km^{2} (415/sq mi)
- Time zone: UTC+1 (CET)
  - Summer (DST): UTC+2 (CEST)
- Postal code: 46040
- Dialing code: 0376
- Website: Official website

Casalmoro (Upper Mantovano: Casalmor) is a comune (municipality) in the Province of Mantua in the Italian region Lombardy, located about 100 kilometres (62 mi) east of Milan and about 35 kilometres (22 mi) northwest of Mantua. As of 1 January 2007, it had a population of 2,154 and an area of 13.9 square kilometres (5.4 mi^{2}).

Casalmoro is the site of the most extensive settlement area known from the Late Bronze Age in Italy. It emerged during the twelfth century BC following the decline of the Terramare culture.

Casalmoro borders the following municipalities: Acquafredda, Asola, Castel Goffredo, Remedello.

== Demographic evolution ==
Historical population

Year	Pop.	±%
1861	1,104	—
1871	1,131	+2.4%
1881	1,124	−0.6%
1901	1,215	+8.1%
1911	1,439	+18.4%

Year	Pop.	±%
1921	1,585	+10.1%
1931	1,709	+7.8%
1936	1,710	+0.1%
1951	1,747	+2.2%
1961	1,665	−4.7%

Year	Pop.	±%
1971	1,661	−0.2%
1981	1,724	+3.8%
1991	1,690	−2.0%
2001	2,049	+21.2%

Source: Data from ISTAT
