= Ceresara =

Ceresara Sareşére (Emilian)
- Comune
- Comune di Ceresara
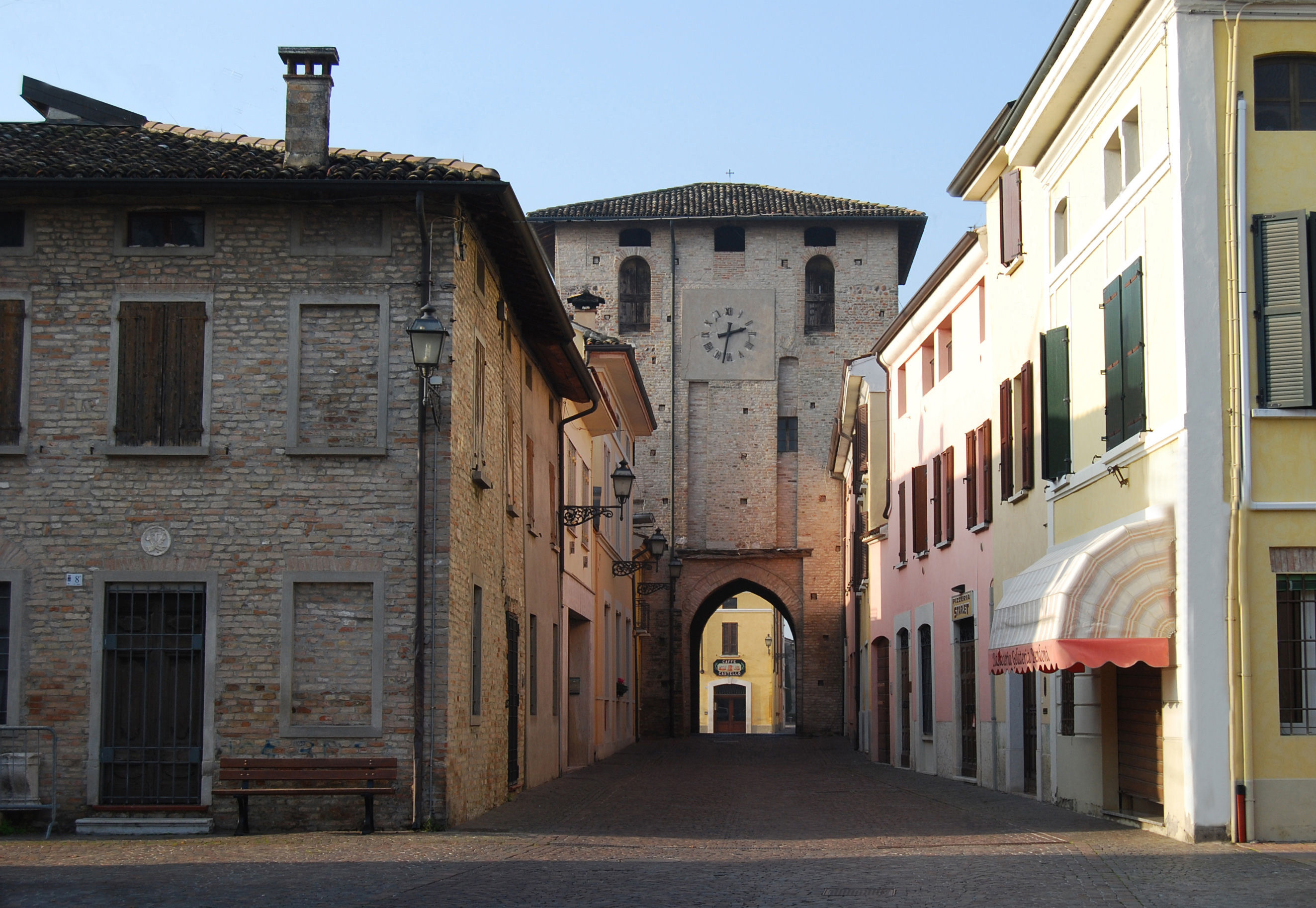

- Location within Italy Location within Lombardy
- Coordinates: 45°16′N 10°34′E
- Country: Italy
- Region: Lombardy
- Province: Province of Mantua (MN)
- Frazioni: San Martino Gusnago, Villa Cappella

Area
  - Total: 37.8 km^{2} (14.6 sq mi)

Population (Dec. 2004)
  - Total: 2,544
  - Density: 67.3/km^{2} (174/sq mi)
- Demonym: Ceresaresi
- Time zone: UTC+1 (CET)
  - Summer (DST): UTC+2 (CEST)
- Postal code: 46040
- Dialing code: 0376
- Website: Official website

Ceresara (Upper Mantovano: Sareşére) is a comune (municipality) in the Province of Mantua in the Italian region Lombardy, located about 110 kilometres (68 mi) east of Milan and about 20 kilometres (12 mi) northwest of Mantua. As of 31 December 2004, it had a population of 2,544 and an area of 37.8 square kilometres (14.6 mi^{2}).

The municipality of Ceresara contains the frazioni (subdivisions, mainly villages and hamlets) San Martino Gusnago and Villa Cappella.

Ceresara borders the following municipalities: Casaloldo, Castel Goffredo, Gazoldo degli Ippoliti, Goito, Guidizzolo, Medole, Piubega, Rodigo.

== Demographic evolution ==
Historical population

Year	Pop.	±%
1861	1,864	—
1871	2,071	+11.1%
1881	2,191	+5.8%
1901	2,364	+7.9%
1911	2,829	+19.7%

Year	Pop.	±%
1921	3,215	+13.6%
1931	3,225	+0.3%
1936	3,216	−0.3%
1951	3,520	+9.5%
1961	3,128	−11.1%

Year	Pop.	±%
1971	2,588	−17.3%
1981	2,532	−2.2%
1991	2,434	−3.9%
2001	2,462	+1.2%

Source: Data from ISTAT
