= Mariana Mantovana =

Municipality in Lombardy, Italy

- Comune
- Comune di Mariana Mantovana
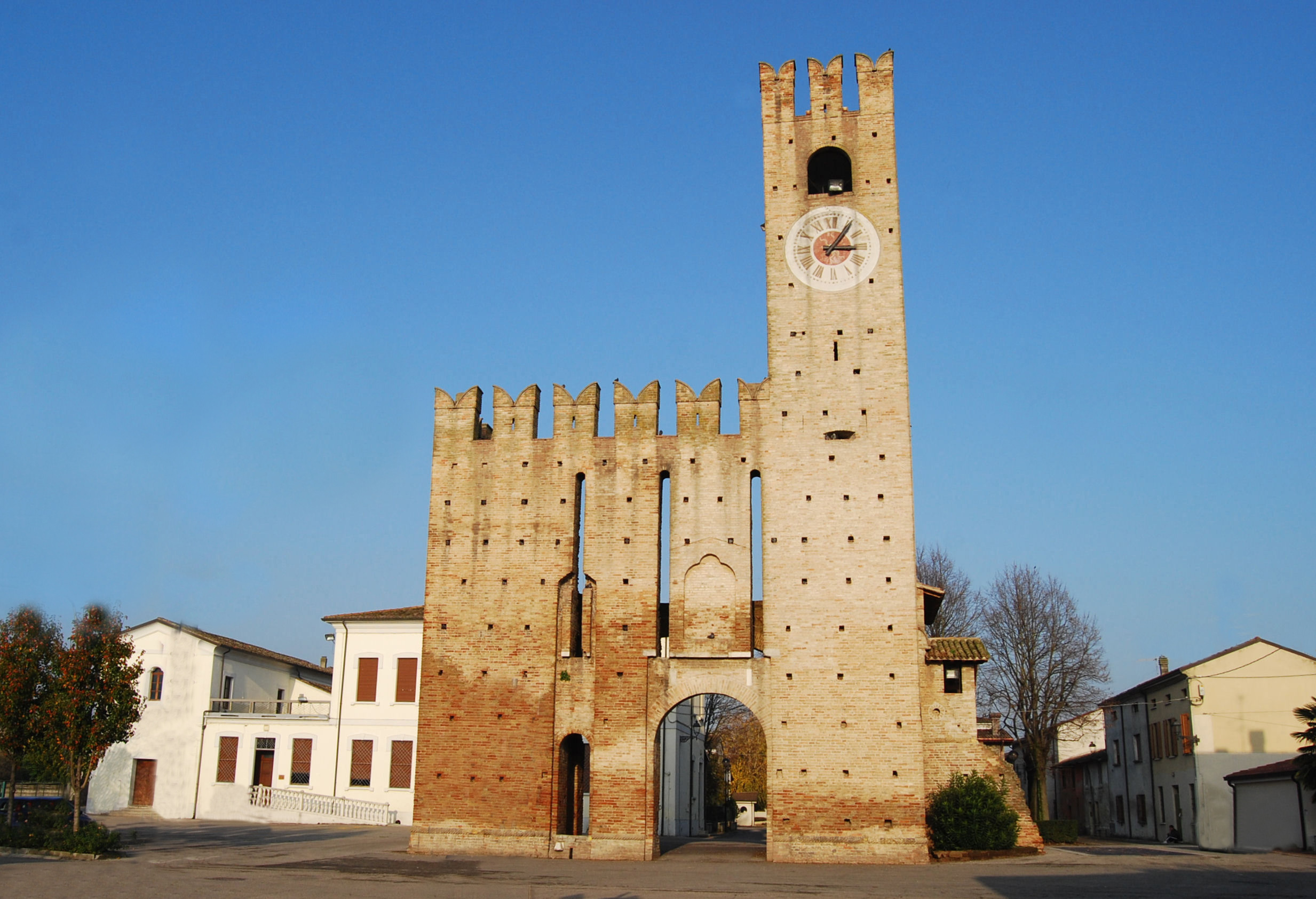

- Location within Italy Location within Lombardy
- Coordinates: 45°12′N 10°29′E
- Country: Italy
- Region: Lombardy
- Province: Mantua (MN)

Government
  - Mayor: Angelo Rosa

Area
  - Total: 8.8 km^{2} (3.4 sq mi)
- Elevation: 36 m (118 ft)

Population (28 February 2017)
  - Total: 744
  - Density: 85/km^{2} (220/sq mi)
- Demonym: Marianesi
- Time zone: UTC+1 (CET)
  - Summer (DST): UTC+2 (CEST)
- Postal code: 46010
- Dialing code: 0376
- Website: Official website

Mariana Mantovana is a comune (municipality) in the Province of Mantua in the Italian region Lombardy, located about 110 kilometres (68 mi) southeast of Milan and about 25 kilometres (16 mi) west of Mantua.

Mariana Mantovana borders the following municipalities: Acquanegra sul Chiese, Asola, Piubega, and Redondesco.
