= Upper Mantua =

Geographical area in Lombardy, Italy

- Map of Upper Mantua
- Area: 608.8 km^{2} (235.1 sq mi)
- Population: 110 222 (2010)
- Population density: 181.05 inh./km^{2}
- Countries: Italy
- Languages: Italian, Lombard
- Time zone: UTC+01:00
- Located in the northern part of the province of Mantua, Lombardy

Upper Mantua (Italian: Alto Mantovano/Upper Mantuan dialect: Alt Mantuà) is a geographical area located northwest of the city of Mantua in the province of the same name and bordering the provinces of Brescia and Verona, bordered to the north by the morainic hills of Lake Garda, to the east by the province of Verona, to the northwest by the province of Brescia, and to the south by the plains of Middle Mantua.

The most significant centers are Castiglione delle Stiviere, Castel Goffredo, and Asola, in whose areas the clothing industry was particularly developed, employing about 7,500 people in 2013. The northern part of Mantua is influenced - in its dialectal inflection, traditions, historical events, religious upbringing, even political choices - by its proximity above all to the province of Brescia and, in part, to that of Verona. The area has a typically agricultural economy, although the post-World War II years saw an increase in industrial production and a lively tertiary activity.

== Territorial extent and municipalities ==
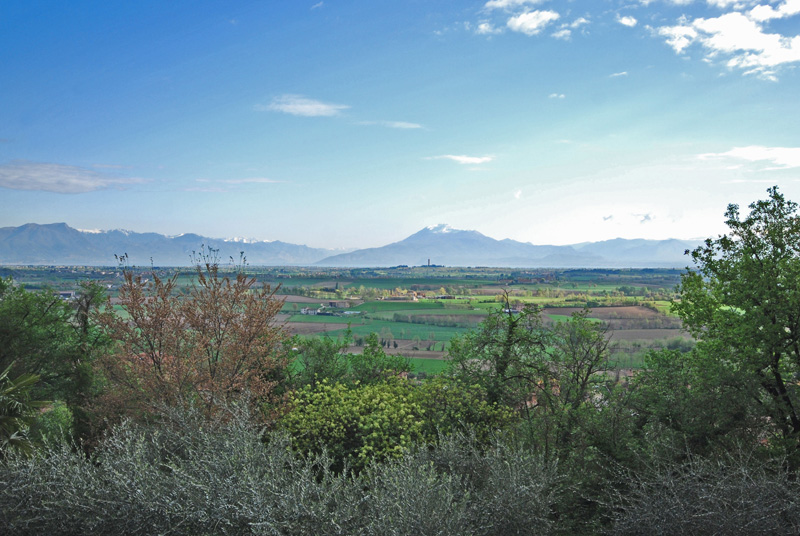
Solferino, the hills towards Lake Garda

Upper Mantua is bounded to the west and east by the Chiese and Mincio rivers respectively, to the north by the morainic hills of Lake Garda, while its southern borders are marked by the mid-Mantuan plain crossed by the Via Postumia.

Historically, politically and civilly, most of its component municipalities have become part of the Mantuan territory only since about the 15th century, while others have become part of it since the 19th century. On the religious level, the majority of the parishes of Upper Mantua until the late eighteenth or early nineteenth century were included in the diocese of Brescia. From a linguistic point of view, a dialect is spoken in the area that, unlike Mantuan, belongs to the group of Lombard dialects and is markedly similar to Brescian.

The northwestern area of the province of Mantua, a territory of fifteen to twenty municipalities mostly already belonging mainly to Brescia, but partly also to Verona, has always retained its own historical and political specificity, and is therefore historically characterized by centrifugal tendencies in relation to Mantua and the rest of its province.

From the official classification of the Province of Mantua, Upper Mantua is an area that groups 14 municipalities:

| Municipality | In Upper Mantuan dialect | Surface area | Population |
|---|---|---|---|
| Casalmoro | Casalmòr | 13 km^{2} | 2 162 |
| Casaloldo | Casalòlt | 16,84 km^{2} | 2 678 |
| Casalromano | Casarimà | 11 km^{2} | 1 480 |
| Castel Goffredo | (èl) Castèl | 42,24 km^{2} | 12 574 |
| Castiglione delle Stiviere | Castiù | 42,09 km^{2} | 23 378 |
| Cavriana | Cavriàna | 36 km^{2} | 3 710 |
| Ceresara | Sareşére | 37 km^{2} | 2 526 |
| Goito | Gùit | 78,82 km^{2} | 10 050 |
| Guidizzolo | Ghidisöl | 22 km^{2} | 5 919 |
| Medole | Médule | 25 km^{2} | 4 107 |
| Monzambano | Mosambàn | 29 km^{2} | 4 934 |
| Ponti sul Mincio | Pónti | 11,50 km^{2} | 2 317 |
| Solferino | Sulfrì | 13 km^{2} | 2 664 |
| Volta Mantovana | la Ólta | 50,31 km^{2} | 7 218 |

Other municipalities, otherwise included in the Middle-West Mantua, are often commonly included in the current concept of Upper Mantua. They are:

| Municipality | In Upper Mantuan dialect | Surface area | Population |
|---|---|---|---|
| Acquanegra sul Chiese | 'Quanégra | 28 km^{2} | 2 795 |
| Asola | Àsula | 73 km^{2} | 9 996 |
| Canneto sull'Oglio | Cané | 25 km^{2} | 4 245 |
| Gazoldo degli Ippoliti | Gasòlt | 12 km^{2} | 2 947 |
| Mariana Mantovana | Mariàna | 8 km^{2} | 794 |
| Piubega | Piübega | 16 km^{2} | 1 692 |
| Redondesco | Redundèsch | 19 km^{2} | 1 215 |

The latter municipalities are all located north of - or at most straddling - the Via Postumia, an ancient Roman road axis that can be taken as an ideal dividing line between Upper Mantua and the rest of Mantua. For the latter classification, which includes more municipalities in Upper Mantua, one can see the news sections in the local newspapers Gazzetta di Mantova and La Voce di Mantova and the Magazine Alto Mantovano column on the television station Telemantova.

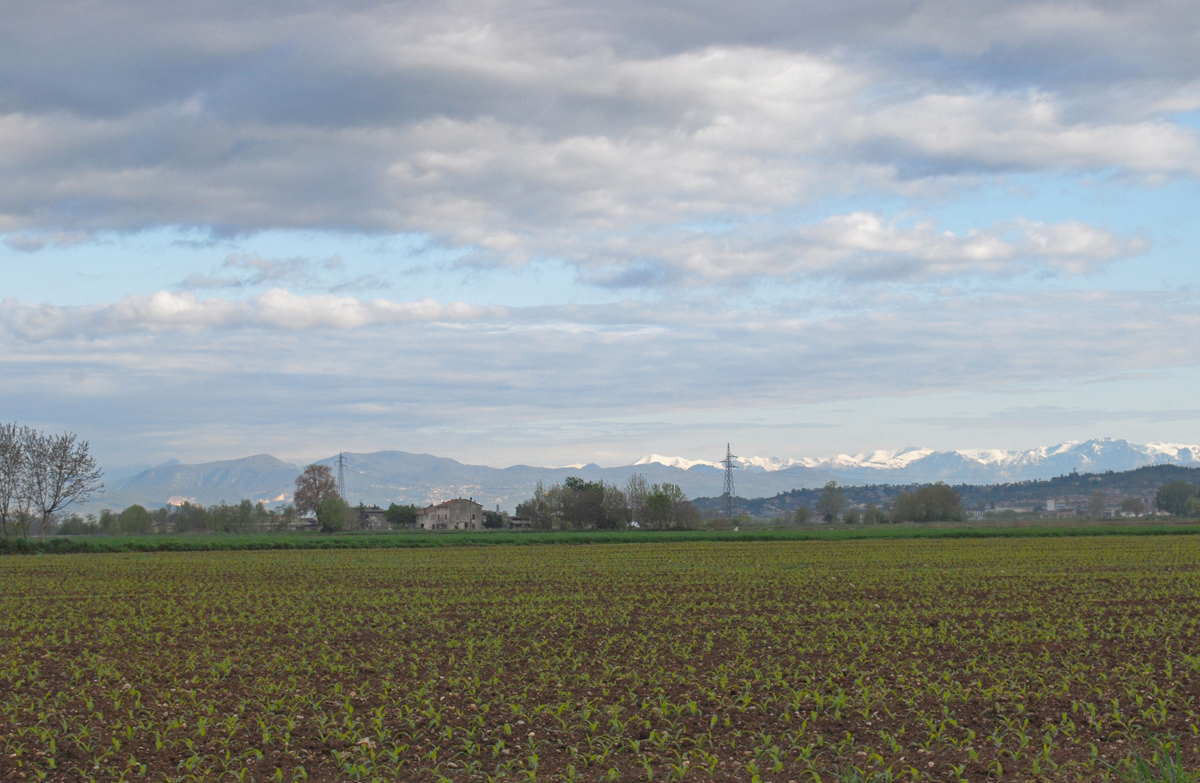
Typical area of Upper Mantua

The Provincial Territorial Coordination Plan of the Province of Mantua, which identifies elements of homogeneity related to environmental features and a historical reading of the settlement system, and highlights a common matrix in terms of cultural values, also describes Upper Mantua, classified as "Circondario A," consisting of 21 municipalities.

The vast majority of municipalities have a population of between 1,000 and 10,000. Only Castiglione delle Stiviere exceeds 20 000 inhabitants, while three municipalities - Castel Goffredo, Goito and Asola - have a population between 10 000 and 20 000; finally, Mariana Mantovana does not reach 1 000 and is the least populous municipality in the entire province of Mantua.

Despite such classifications, the definition of the upper Mantuan territory remains quite subjective due to the fact that, despite its uniformity, it remains primarily a geographic-cultural region without real political references, nor has it ever been an autonomous political-religious entity in the past.

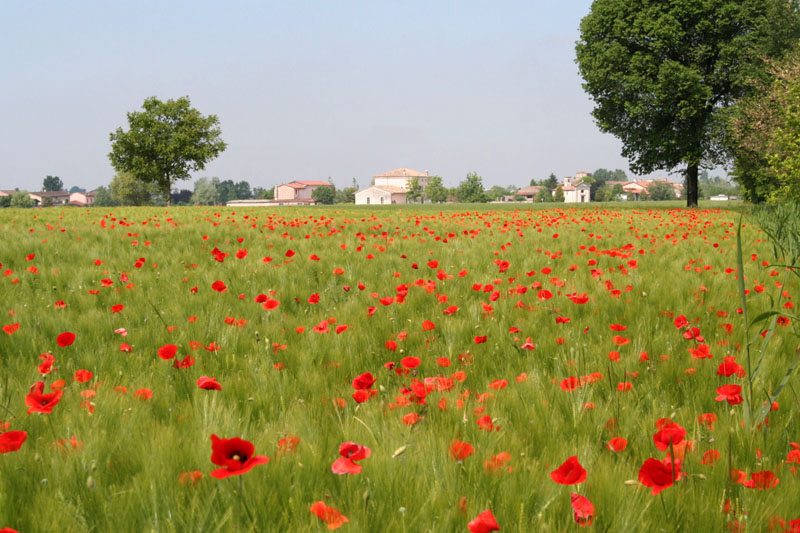
The countryside

The very concept and terminology of Upper Mantua came to be formed rather late in history and essentially the relation to the position and role it occupied within the province of Mantua.

From a historical, religious, cultural and linguistic point of view, the lands currently referred to as Upper Mantua gravitated in the past mainly within the sphere of influence of Brescia or Verona. Even after the coming of the influence exerted by Mantua, mainly due to the Gonzaga family, Upper Mantua often configured itself as a periphery sector or appendix within the Mantuan state, even maintaining its own autonomy, in the case of fiefdoms ruled by lineages independent of Mantua.

The criteria taken into consideration to define Upper Mantua can be diverse:

- Historic-ecclesiastical: this would refer to and include the territories that remained for much of the common era under the administrative dependencies - not only civil, but also religious - of the cities of Brescia and Verona, instead of Mantua. In such a wide historical span, however, there were many political and civil changes and alternations, which make a definition based only on this criterion tenuous. Simplifying and referring only to much of the medieval and modern periods, the lands corresponding to the municipalities of: Casalmoro, Casaloldo, Casalromano, Castel Goffredo, Castiglione delle Stiviere, Guidizzolo, Medole, Solferino, Acquanegra sul Chiese, Asola, Canneto sull'Oglio, Mariana Mantovana, and Redondesco. These territories were included until the 18th-19th centuries in the diocese of Brescia and until the late Middle Ages - but some even beyond - in the district headed by the same city - duchy, county, or medieval commune. In the early Middle Ages some of these towns, those further north, were included in the duchy and episcopate of Verona. Added to these municipalities are Monzambano and Ponti sul Mincio, which since Roman times have always gravitated to the Verona orbit, civilly until the 19th century, and religiously even until the 20th.
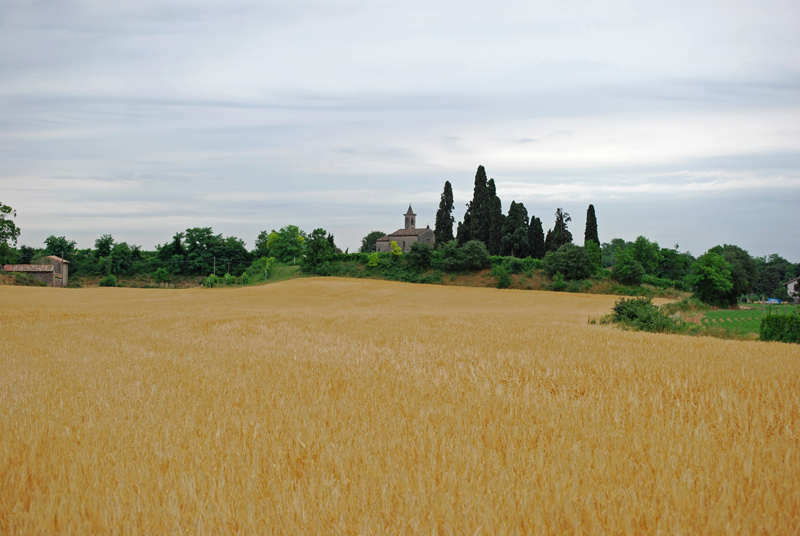
  Moraine hills in the area of Monzambano
- Geographic: this is the criterion most often followed in studies and publications concerning Upper Mantua, which often tend to restrict this notion to the hilly or foothill sector only, disregarding historical considerations. The geographical criterion can refer to altimetrical altitude - thus upper in the sense of elevated -, and in that case it includes only hilly municipalities and at most those immediately on the slopes of the morainic reliefs: Castiglione delle Stiviere, Guidizzolo, Medole, Solferino, Monzambano, Ponti sul Mincio, Cavriana, Volta Mantovana; alternatively, upper can be considered in the sense of situated north of the rest of the province of Mantua. Even in the latter case, however, since the morainic hills are located in the very northernmost belt of the province, it is essentially the same municipalities just listed that are involved, at most with some greater extension toward the plain, affecting in particular Castel Goffredo, Goito, Ceresara, Casaloldo, Casalmoro, and Casalromano, as in the classification of the province of Mantua.
- Linguistic: finally, one can consider the territories in which variants of the Brescian dialect - the so-called Upper Mantuan dialects, or, marginally, of the Veronese dialect - are spoken, as opposed to the Mantuan dialect spoken in the capital and its surrounding area and various transitional dialects that can be placed practically halfway between Brescian and Mantuan. According to this criterion, one would have Upper Mantua composed of: Casalmoro, Casaloldo, Casalromano, Castel Goffredo, Castiglione delle Stiviere, Guidizzolo, Medole, Solferino, Acquanegra sul Chiese, Asola, Canneto sull'Oglio, Mariana Mantovana, Ceresara, Cavriana, Volta Mantovana, Ponti sul Mincio, Monzambano, and Piubega. Excluded would be Gazoldo degli Ippoliti, Goito, and Redondesco, where the dialect is transitional between Brescia and Mantua and is now close to the latter.

== Territory and environment ==
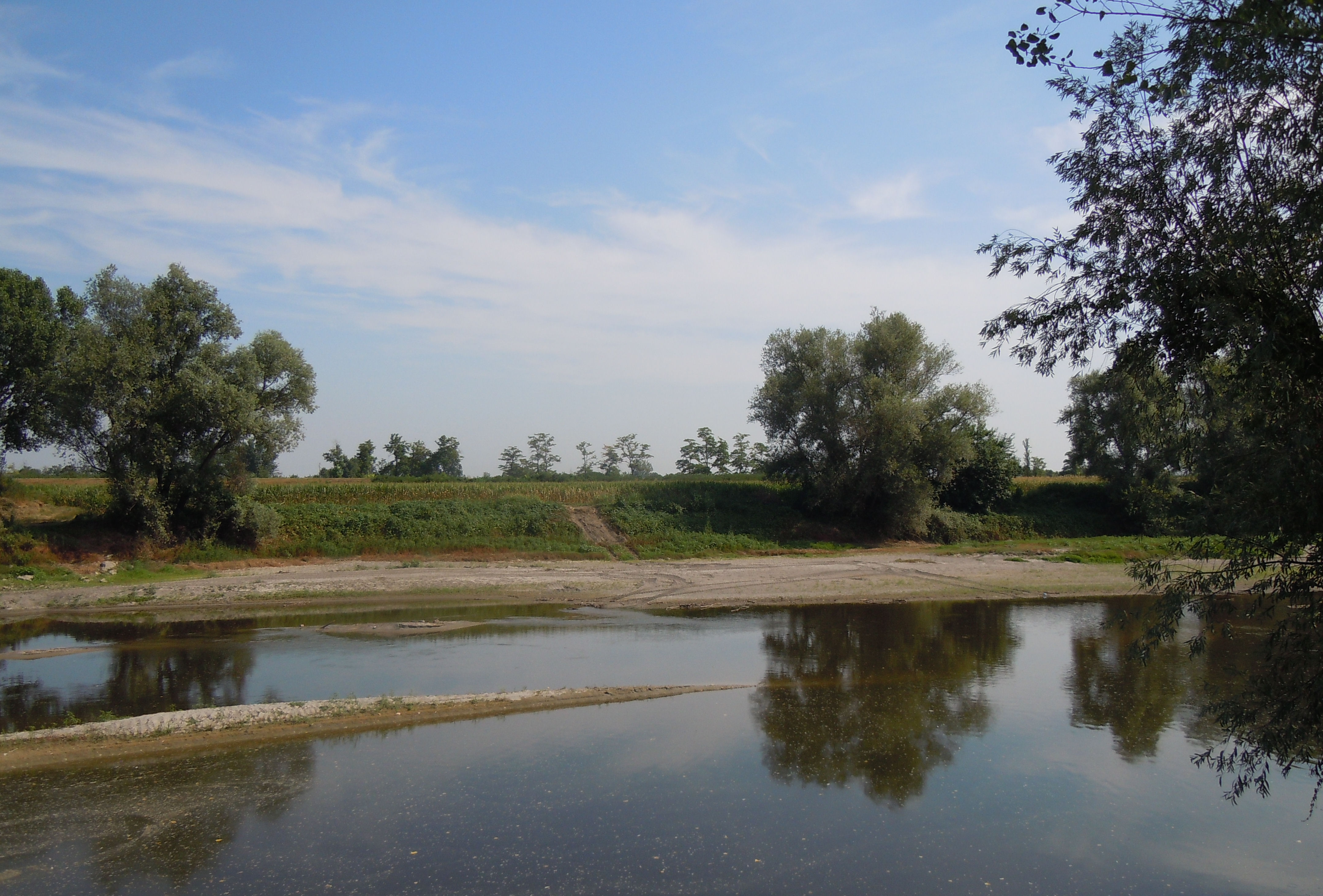
The Oglio River in the South Oglio Park

The territory can be roughly divided, with regard first of all to elevation and landform, into two large areas, one hilly to the north and the other of lowland to the southwest, to which correspond different environmental and vegetative characteristics.

- Moraine hills and sub-hill area (gravelly high plain): Castiglione delle Stiviere, Cavriana, Guidizzolo, Medole, Monzambano, Ponti sul Mincio, Solferino, Volta Mantovana.
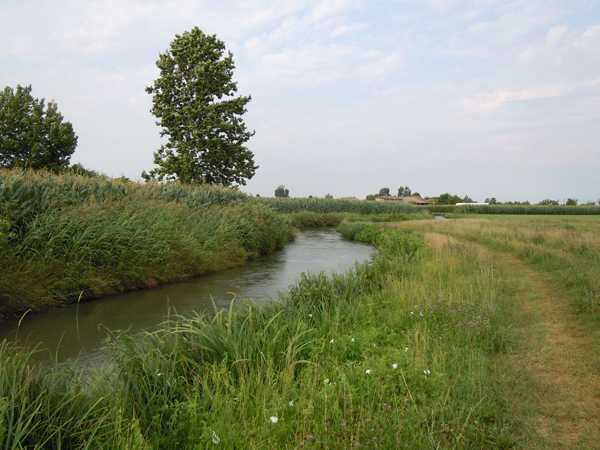
  The Seriola Piubega stream
- Flat plateau between Mincio and Oglio: Acquanegra sul Chiese, Asola, Canneto sull'Oglio, Casalmoro, Casaloldo, Casalromano, Castel Goffredo, Ceresara, Gazoldo degli Ippoliti, Goito, Mariana Mantovana, Piubega, Redondesco.

This flat area of upper and middle plain is traversed by the Mincio, Oglio, and Chiese rivers and shorter watercourses such as the Tartari, Osone, Solfero, and Caldone; it is characterized by fine-grained fluvial sediments - sands, silts, clays - slightly sloping toward the axial part of the Po River course.

In turn, the landscape of the lowland plateau is divided into: medium hydromorphic plain or historical karst springs; low plain and river valley landscapes, with the Chiese valley, Oglio valley and Mincio valley.

Upper Mantua is bordered on three sides by three major rivers: to the west the Chiese, near the border with Brescia; to the east the Mincio - which for a stretch marks the border with the province of Verona; to the southwest the Oglio - which marks the border with the province of Cremona. Several minor watercourses are located between the Oglio and the Mincio, whose origin is due to the confluence of resurgence waters, which contribute with their deposits to the landscape of the river valleys. In the area corresponding to the town of Castel Goffredo there are numerous resurgences.

The climate of Upper Mantua is the one typical of the Po Valley.

== History ==
The history of Upper Mantua begins in the Neolithic period, with the oldest certain evidence of human presence in the area. If during the Paleolithic and Mesolithic periods these lands were sporadically frequented by a few nomadic hunters, it was during the 6th-5th millennia B.C. that a settled presence was consolidated with some stable settlements of farmers and breeders. On these substrata, during the third and second millennia B.C.E., the metallurgical cultures of the Copper Age and Bronze Age developed. The latter is characterized by the spread in the area of the moraine hills of Bronze Age pile-dwelling villages, since the year 2011 recognized as a UNESCO World Heritage Site.

Later, from the first half of the 1st millennium BC, the settlement of Gallic peoples and the first stages of Romanization occurred. Prehistory in Upper Mantua ended with the final Roman conquest of the region, in the 1st century BC, when, with the granting of Roman law and the triumviral agrarian laws, the entire territory of Upper Mantua was definitively included in Roman Italy, specifically, in Augustan times, in Regio X Venetia et Histria. In the context of a territory in which the Cenoman Gauls were settled, the Romanization of Upper Mantua is evidenced by numerous archaeological remains of buildings, villas, necropolis, infrastructure and the vestiges of centuriation, all of which document the daily life of a provincial area in imperial times.

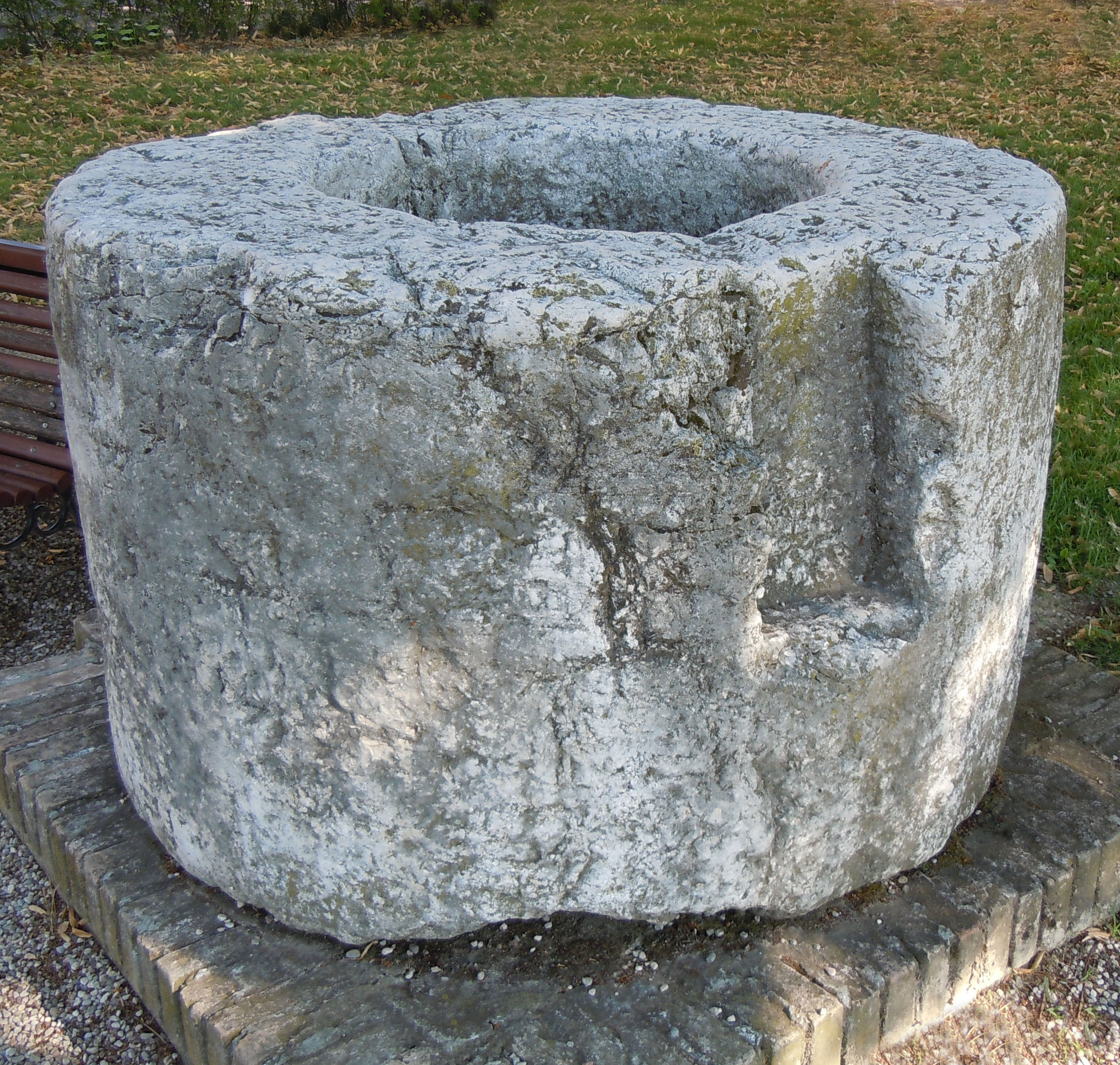
Gromatic cippus of Roman age placed in the public gardens of Castel Goffredo

In Roman times the upper Mantuan area was probably divided between the agres of Brixia, Mantua, and Verona. The exact affiliation of the area is debated, so much so that in the official collection of Latin inscriptions epigraphs from the territory were given a separate section, disjointed from each of the major surrounding cities: the Ager inter Benacum, Mincium, Ollium, Clesum, largely coinciding with the present limits of Upper Mantua.

Christianized between the 4th and 5th centuries, during the Middle Ages the territory came under Lombard control first (6th-8th centuries) and then Carolingian (8th-9th centuries), and then became part of the Holy Roman Empire (10th-14th centuries).

In 568-569 the Lombards, after the invasion of the Goths - who may have left their mark in the name of the town of Goito - entered Italy and quickly subdued most of the northern regions (Langobardia Maior); the Duchies of Brescia and Verona, within which Upper Mantua was probably subdivided, were among the first Lombard duchies to be established, in the aftermath of the conquest.

For much of the Lombard and Frankish ages Upper Mantua was accorded a degree of independence: much of it was included in a minor district practically autonomous from neighboring duchies, centered on Lake Garda and reporting to the Benacense town of Sirmione. With the decline of this administrative structure, a number of noble families appeared in the western area of Upper Mantua, endowed with the title of count and designated by the common name of Ugoni-Longhi, who for a good part of the Middle Ages maintained practically autonomous rural lordships in the territory, before the neighboring city municipalities, primarily that of Brescia, incorporated them into their domain.

Upper Mantua as it appears today, that is, as a peripheral sector of the province of Mantua, was formed over the course of many centuries. In Roman and medieval times, only part of the territory now included in the northern part of the province of Mantua was really Mantuan: with some certainty, only Gazoldo degli Ippoliti, Goito, Volta Mantovana, and Cavriana, the lands, that is, closest to the capital.

A good part of the lands now in Mantua were incorporated as a result of the expansionist drive promoted by the Gonzaga especially during the 14th-15th centuries - Castel Goffredo, Castiglione delle Stiviere, Solferino, Guidizzolo, Medole, Redondesco, Mariana Mantovana, Acquanegra sul Chiese, Canneto sull'Oglio, Casalromano -, at the expense of the Brescian district: it was what was then called "Mantovano Nuovo".

From the Late Middle Ages the Upper Mantuan area assumed even greater strategic importance, becoming the object of the struggles between the lineages of the Scaligeri of Verona - who had the castles of Castellaro Lagusello and Ponti sul Mincio built -, the Gonzaga of Mantua and the Visconti of Milan and Brescia: between the 14th and 15th centuries there is evidence of great instability in the area, with various concessions aimed at obtaining allegiance and spontaneous or unspontaneous dedications by individual communities to this or that power. Along the border between Brescia, Mantua and Verona there were repeated changes of dominion and this resulted in very peculiar relational dynamics between neighboring towns.

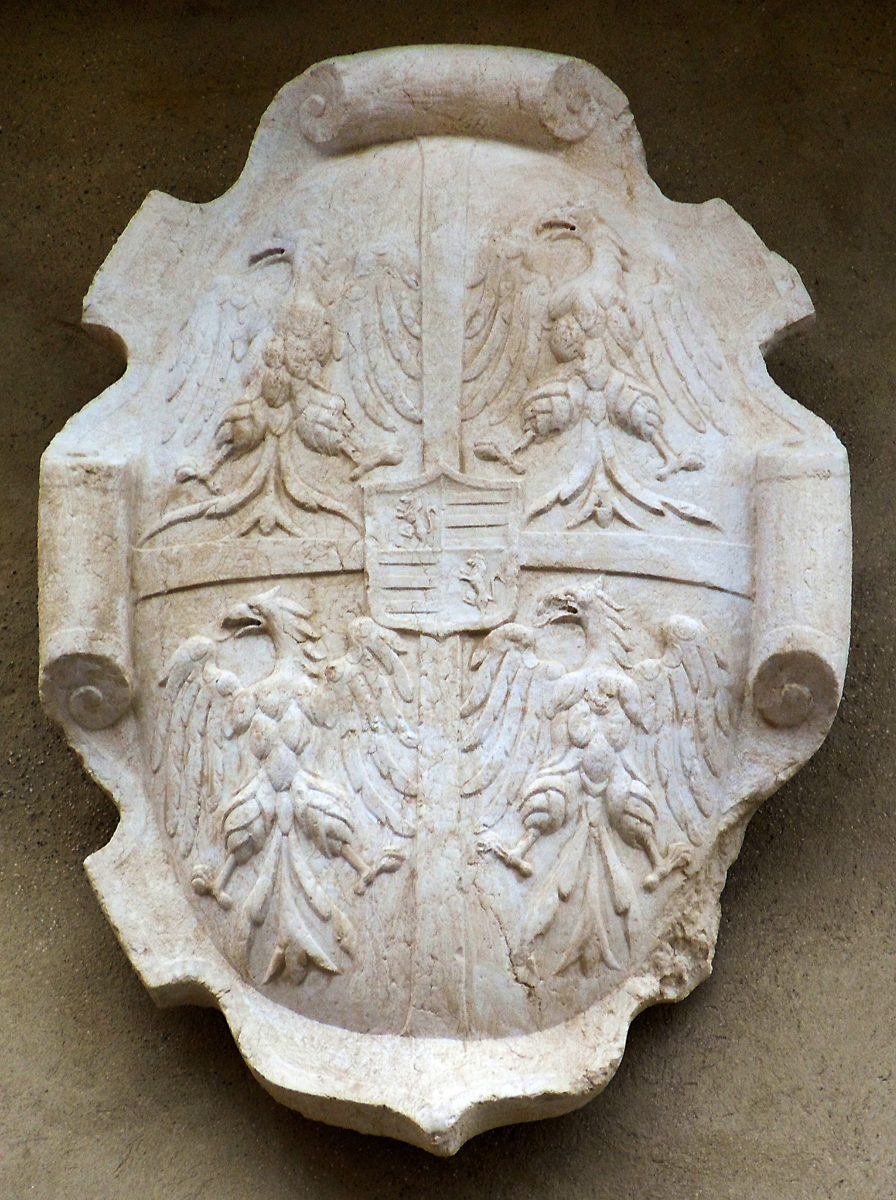
Castel Goffredo, civic tower, marble coat of arms with the arms of the Gonzaga (16th century)

The two superpowers Venice and Milan, with the Viscontis extending their control during the 14th century especially to the western portion of the area, fought for a long time during the 14th-15th centuries over the Brescian area and thus the Upper Mantuan area. Targeted by the Gonzaga because of its proximity to Mantua, it would eventually come under their control for the most part, but often with the interested support and explicit approval of the powerful Serenissima, whose allies the lords of Mantua were at the time. These places would remain under the dependencies of the great Gonzaga dynasty until their final fall in 1707.

A more stable political situation was to come in the late fifteenth century. After ousting the Viscontis (March 1426), Brescia made an act of dedication to the Republic of Venice, but by that time many towns in the Upper Mantuan area were subject to the rule of Mantua. Only the so-called "Asolano," including Asola, Casalmoro, Casaloldo, Casalpoglio, and the Veronese municipalities of Monzambano and Ponti sul Mincio, remained among the Domini di Terraferma of the Serenissima. Asolano was included in the province of Mantua only from the 19th century, as were the municipalities of Monzambano and Ponti.

Upper Mantua and the surrounding lands (e.g., Lonato del Garda and Peschiera del Garda) still remained for years the object of contention, now between the Serenissima and the Gonzaga, who became its enemies after a resounding change of alliances: attempts by the Mantuans to annex other lands lasted until the early 16th century, although the borders remained essentially stable and coincided with those set by the Peace of Cremona in 1441.

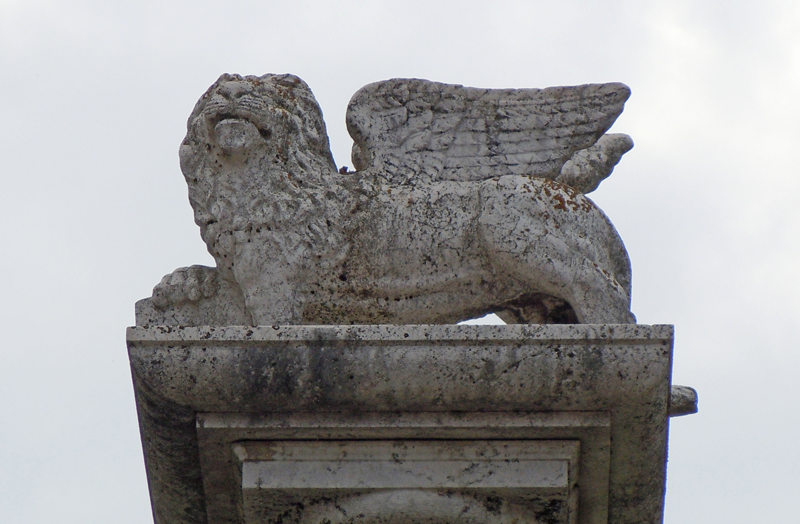
Asola, the Lion of St. Mark

From the Middle Ages onward the Upper Mantuan area has always been a "borderland", where many battles and skirmishes took place between the Papacy and the Empire during the Investiture Controversy. This situation can be found in the same period in many other parts of Italy, but in this case the sense of living on the "border" continued in later eras with the dominations of the Visconti, the Gonzaga and the Most Serene Republic of Venice (Battle of Casaloldo, May 1509).

The territory has always experienced the life of border lands, trying from time to time to seize the privileges of this condition or to avoid its damage. The presence of towers and castles is certainly linked to this particular situation that has dragged on for centuries, due to the particular geographical location of this area, for centuries disputed between different political and religious institutions. All this gave rise to a series of important presences and influences, such as the settlement in the territory of families strongly linked to the Gonzaga or the Serenissima, who left many signs of their presence in palaces, churches, and courtyards.

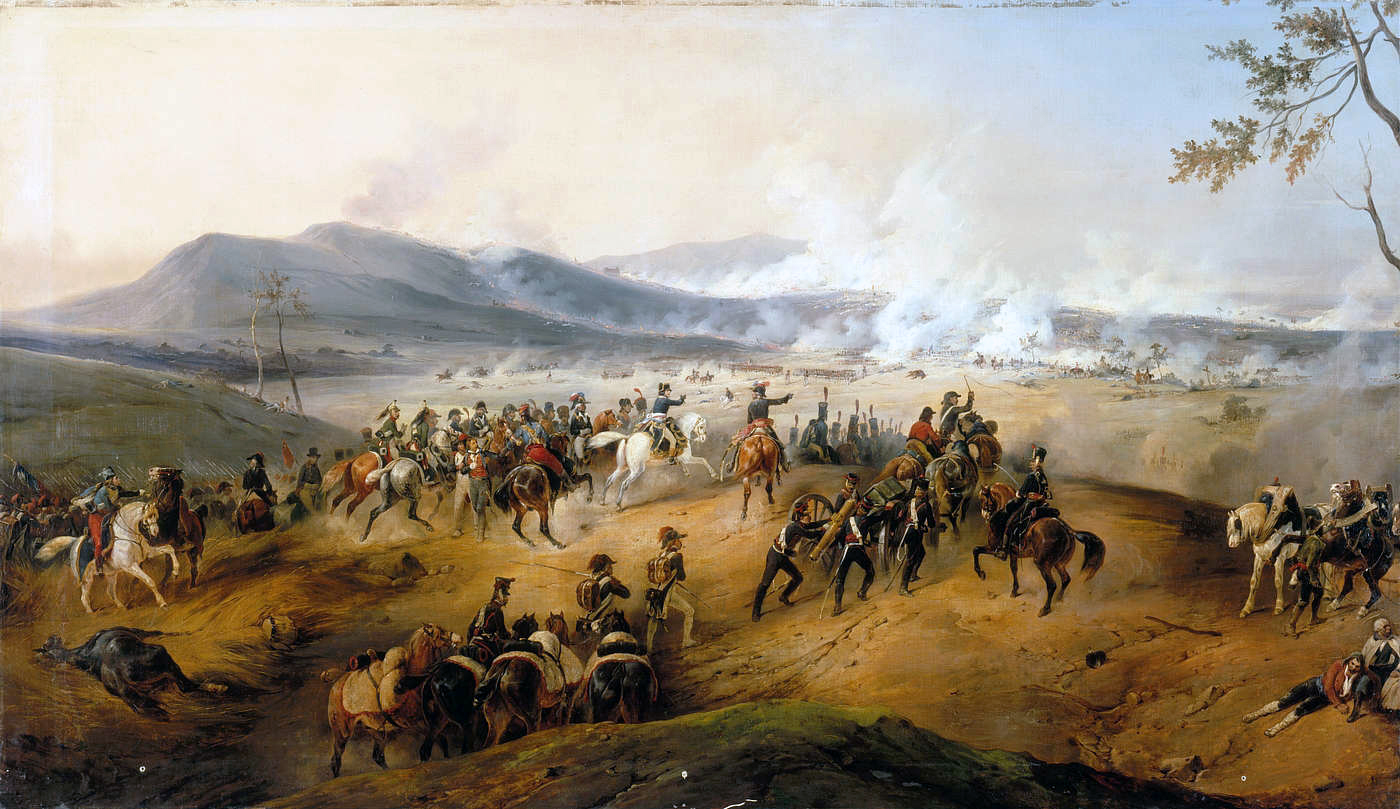
Battle of Castiglione (1796) (oil on canvas by Victor Adam)

In the seventeenth century, in the years 1628 - 1630, Upper Mantua was repeatedly traversed and disrupted by troop movements in the course of the war of succession for the Duchy of Mantua, with Venice intervening, trying to control the situation in Upper Mantua, siding with the French in defense of the rights of the Gonzaga-Nevers, against the imperials.

The eighteenth century was a century of transition, which saw in Upper Mantua the end of the secular dominations of the Gonzagas first (1707), following the Battle of Castiglione delle Stiviere in 1706, and of the Republic of Venice later (1796), which were beginning to be taken over by great powers at a level that was no longer local and all in all circumscribed, but European, first and foremost the Austrians. Under these, most of Upper Mantua, which was already part of the Gonzaga state, was included in the province of Mantua.

The towns in the area suffered new devastation during the War of the Spanish Succession, in the years 1701-1708, with the French and imperial armies alternating several times in the passage and control over the area.

The 19th century is a very complex period. From a military point of view, even after the fall of the Gonzaga and Venetian states, other important battles, even more famous, took place in the lands of Upper Mantua, including the Battle of Castiglione (1796), in which Napoleon Bonaparte was the protagonist, and those, decisive for the fate of the Unification of Italy, of Goito in 1848, and especially Solferino and San Martino in 1859. The idea of the Red Cross, the largest international humanitarian organization, was born in the lands of Upper Mantua as a result of this battle.

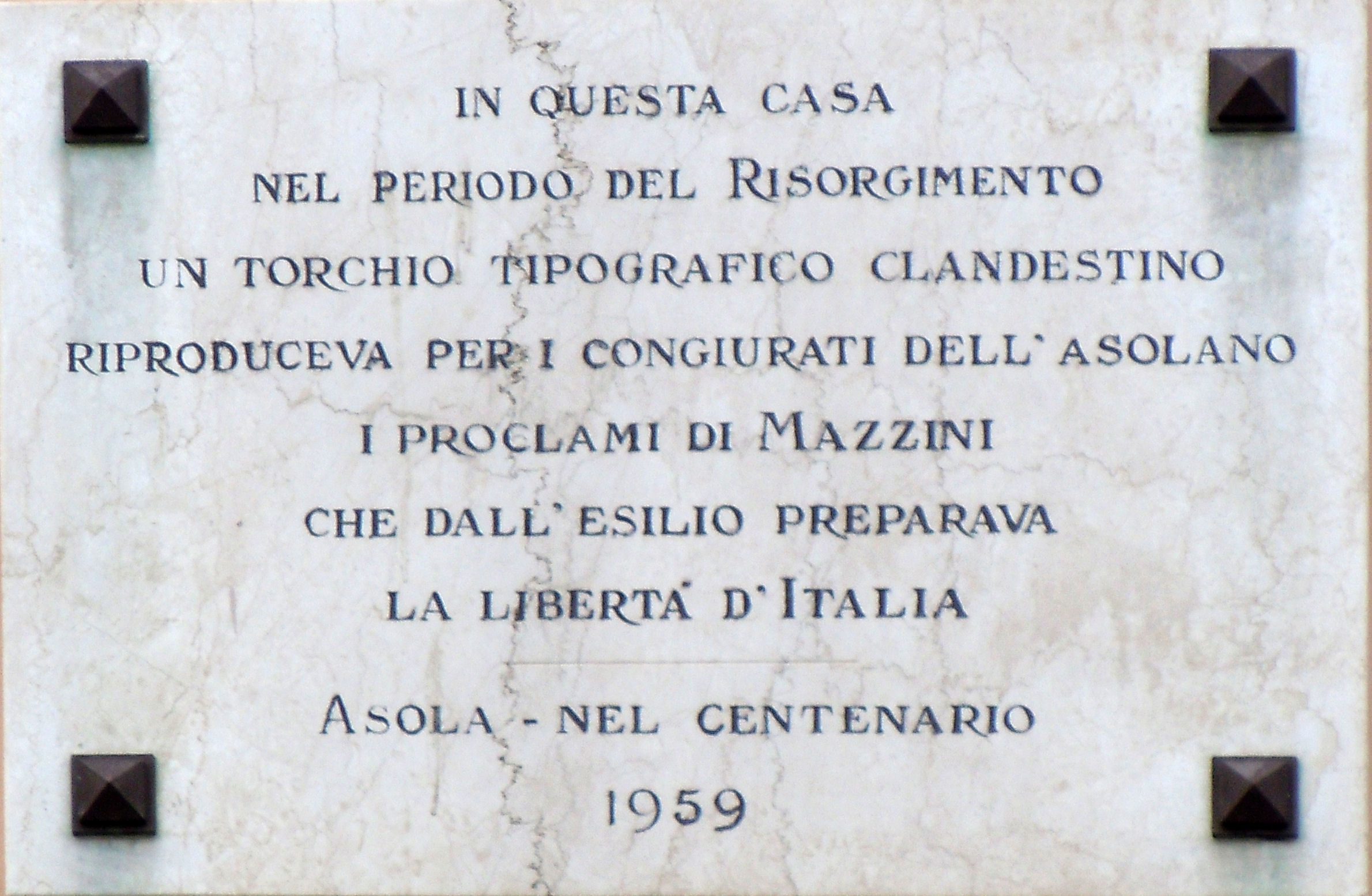
Asola, Risorgimento plaque

Politically, between 1797 and 1814 the area, after finally assuming the unitary configuration under the dependencies of Mantua that is still present today, was subject to French rule in the Napoleonic Empire, and then became part of the Habsburg Lombardy-Venetia Kingdom. During the Risorgimento, especially from 1848, the area witnessed a lively anti-Austrian coordination, extended to several social levels, which would later culminate, in nearby Mantua, with the episode of the Martyrs of Belfiore. After the Second Italian War of Independence, the Upper Mantuan area entered first the Kingdom of Sardinia (1859) and then the Kingdom of Italy (1861), whose fortunes it followed until 1946, when the Italian state was transformed into a republic.

On September 19, 1926 in Castel Goffredo the Catholic teacher Anselmo Cessi was assassinated by the Fascists, who was counted by John Paul II, on the occasion of the Great Jubilee, among the "martyrs of our time".

In the political elections that followed during the nineteenth and twentieth centuries, Upper Mantua distinguished itself from the rest of the province, where socialist positions were recorded, by a more right-wing orientation: Christian Democracy in the area often managed to maintain good results.

=== Symbols ===
Coat of arms of the Province of Mantua

Upper Mantua does not have an official coat of arms or symbol: however, it is ideally given a place in the coat of arms of the Province of Mantua; the latter is composed of three parts, in addition to that of the city of Mantua appear the symbols of Bozzolo - indicating the territories formerly of Cremona and later acquired by the Gonzaga family - and Castiglione delle Stiviere, indicating precisely that portion of Mantua that was formerly Brescian and later Mantuan.

== Monuments and places of interest ==
Monuments in the Upper Mantuan area include:

=== Religious buildings ===
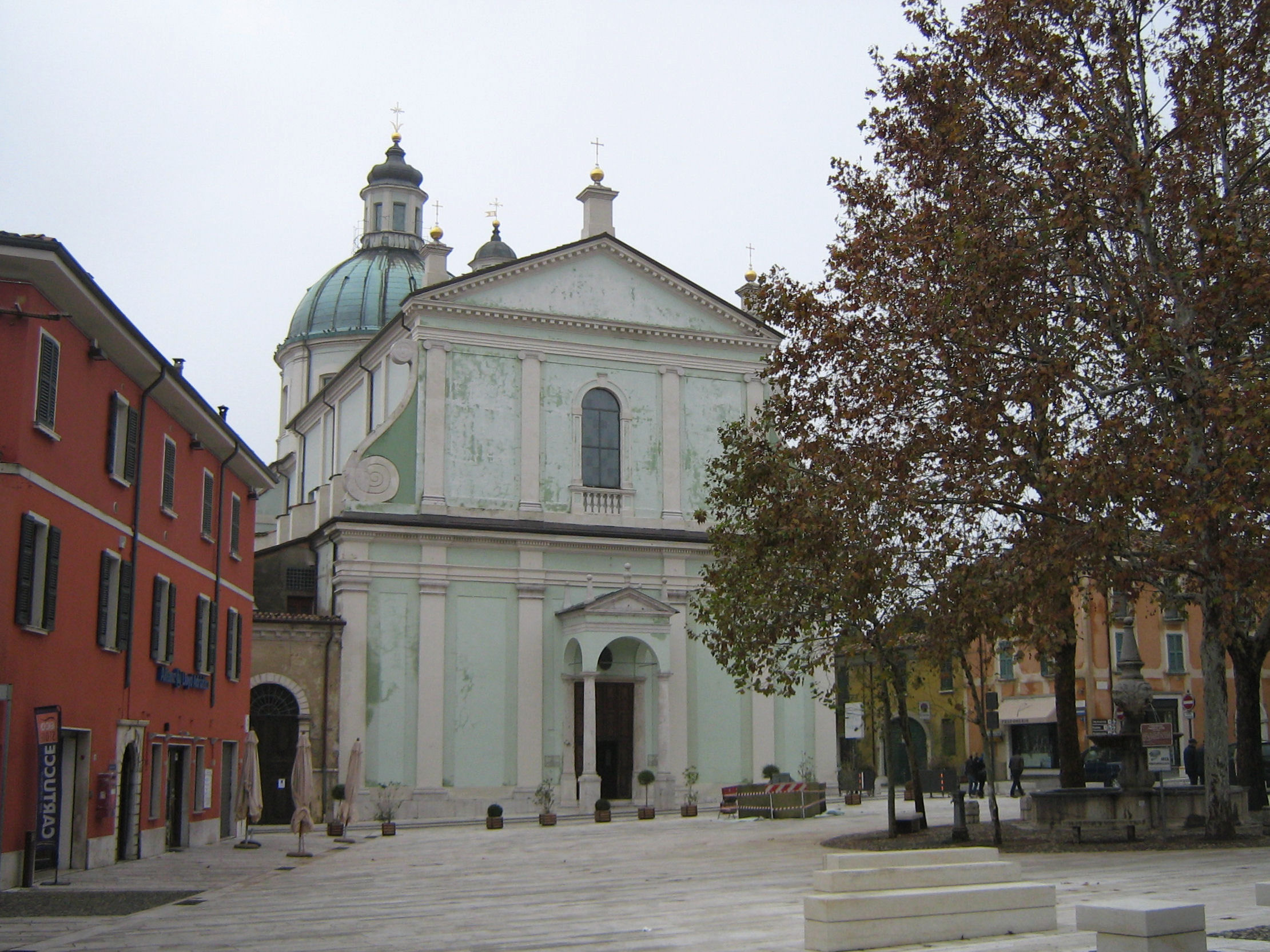
Sanctuary Basilica of San Luigi Gonzaga in Castiglione delle Stiviere

- Sanctuary Basilica of San Luigi Gonzaga and Cathedral in Castiglione delle Stiviere
- Shrine of Our Lady of Pieve in Cavriana
- Church of St. Thomas the Apostle in Acquanegra sul Chiese
- Cathedral of St. Andrew in Asola
- Church of Sant'Erasmo in Castel Goffredo
- Convent of the Annunciata in Medole

=== Civil buildings ===
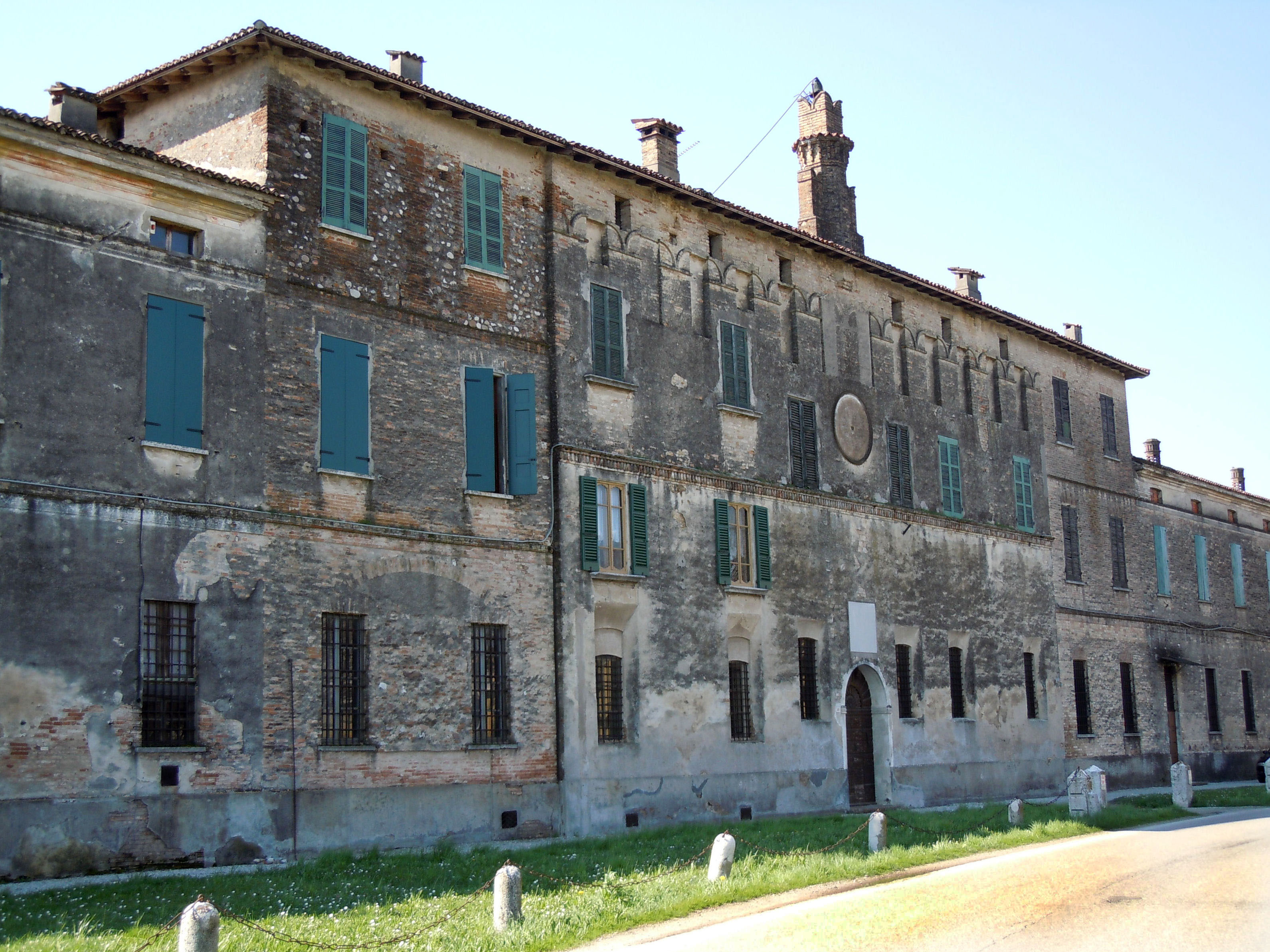
San Martino Gusnago, Secco-Pastore Palace

- Villa Mirra in Cavriana
- Villa Beffa in Castel Goffredo
- Secco-Pastore Palace in San Martino Gusnago
- Gonzaga-Guerrieri Palace in Volta Mantovana

=== Military architecture ===
- Casalodi Tower in Casaloldo
- Gonzaga-Acerbi Palace in Castel Goffredo
- Gonzaga Castle in Castiglione delle Stiviere
- Civic tower in Piubega
- Redondesco Castle

=== Archaeological sites ===
- Baselle archaeological area in Asola
- Rassica archaeological area in Castel Goffredo
- Codosso archaeological area in Castel Goffredo

== Society ==
Upper Mantua has experienced good industrial development in recent decades, but it still retains many traces of the rural life to which it remained attached until not so long ago. Today in the area, as now in many others in Italy and especially in the Po Valley, society has become multiethnic, with a significant presence of foreign citizens.

=== Demographic development ===
During the last few years in Upper Mantua there has been steady population growth for all municipalities; compared to 2007 data, the population increased from 4% in Gazoldo degli Ippoliti to 1% in Casalmoro. Significant figures were seen for di Castel Goffredo (+3.2%) and Casaloldo (+2.7%).

The upward trend can be attributed to an increase in the foreign population, attracted by significant industrial centers: in Castiglione delle Stiviere the food, dairy and hosiery center, in Castel Goffredo the hosiery center, and in Gazoldo degli Ippoliti the metal-mechanical center.

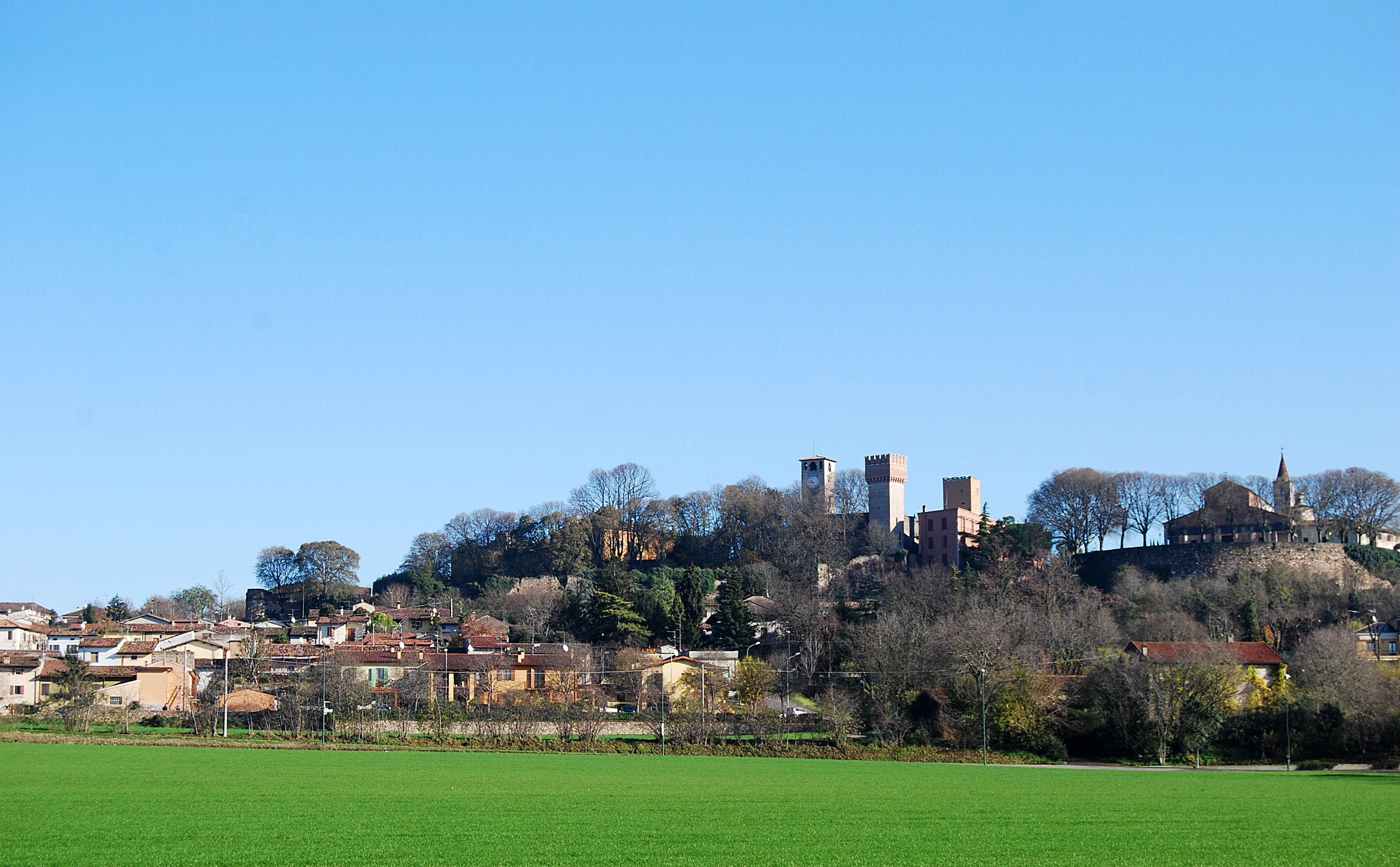
Panorama of Volta Mantovana

Since 2002, the territory of the province of Mantua has had a population increase of 33,027 or 8.9 percent, and a further increase of between 2 percent and 4.4 percent was expected by the end of 2012. Upper Mantua contributed particularly to this expansion with a population growth of 14.5%. Thus the population density of this area increased from 150 inhabitants per km^{2} in 1997 to 171 in 2007.

The natural balance of the observed territory, unique in the province, amounted to +275 individuals as of December 31, 2007, and on that date further growth was calculated for 2012 due to the young age of the inhabitants.

The population is mainly concentrated in the municipalities of Castiglione (506 inhabitants per km^{2}), Castel Goffredo (269 inhabitants per km^{2}), Guidizzolo (263 inhabitants per km^{2}), and Gazoldo degli Ippoliti (219 inhabitants per km^{2}). The development is linked to the growth dynamics of some municipalities, among them particularly Casaloldo (+26.6%), Castel Goffredo (+22.7%), Ponti sul Mincio (+22.2%) and Castiglione (+20.5%). There is to consider that the municipalities in this area show lower values of the old-age and structural dependency index than the rest of the province. This aspect is significant in the municipalities of Casalmoro, Castiglione and Castel Goffredo where the population structure appears less unbalanced toward the older age groups.

=== Foreign ethnicities and minorities ===
This is an area with a strong presence of foreigners, compared to the entire province of Mantua. The municipalities with the highest percentage of foreigners (data as of December 31, 2008) are: Casalmoro (19.7 percent), Castel Goffredo (19.1 percent), Castiglione (18.8 percent), and Casaloldo (18.1 percent), all located in Alto Mantovano. Gazoldo degli Ippoliti, on the other hand, ranks a bit lower with 12.8%, a figure that is nevertheless higher than the entire province as a whole (11.4%).

The composition of the population by major age groups describes a decidedly young foreign population composed mainly of people of working age and children, with a practically nonexistent presence of the elderly.

=== Language and dialects ===
Upper Mantuan is a Lombard dialect: in particular, it belongs to the group of eastern Lombard dialects, along with Brescian, Bergamasque, Cremasque or Upper Cremonese, and western Trentino; and it differs from urban Mantuan, a dialect of the Emilian language.

=== Religion ===
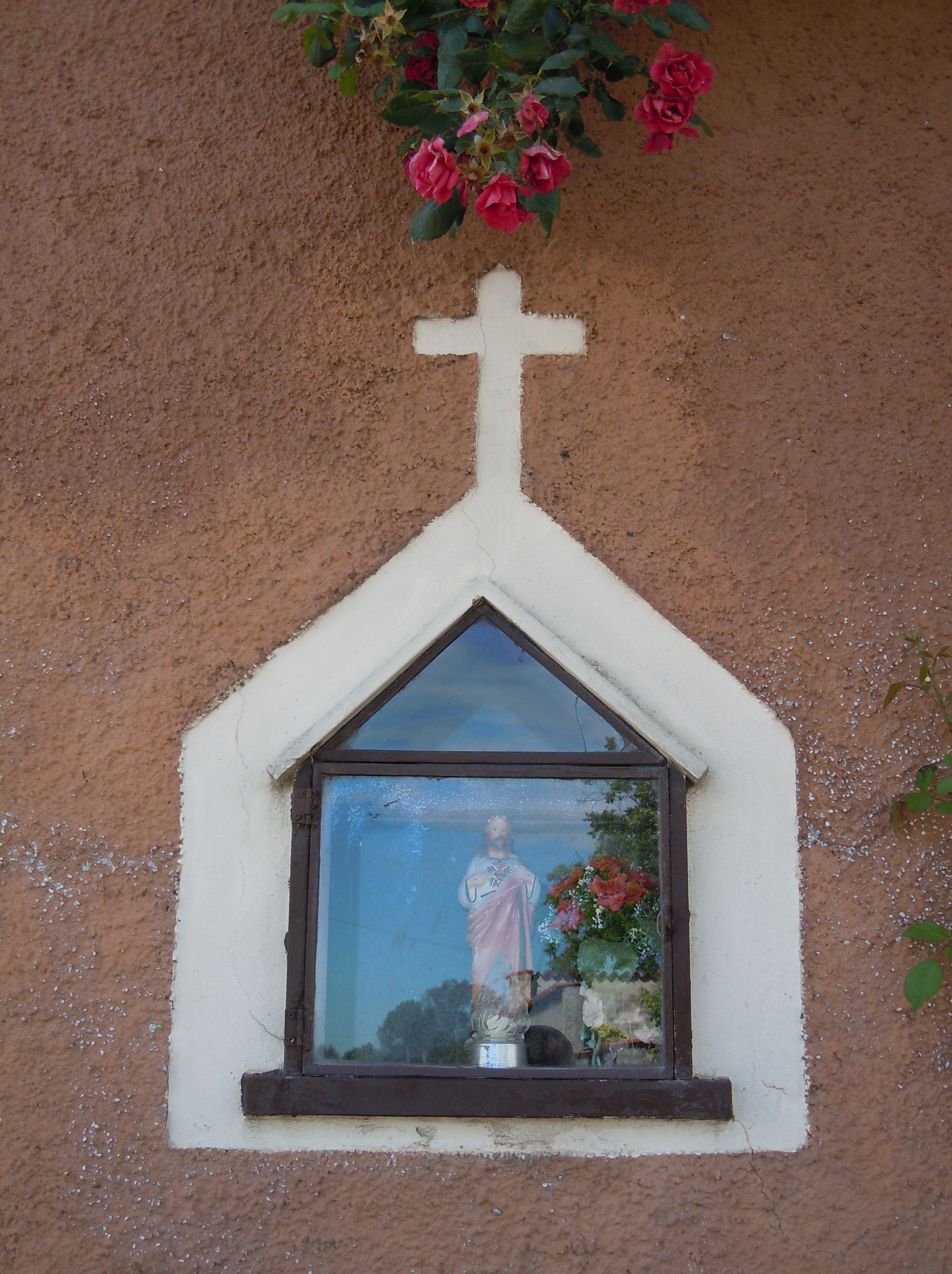
Shrine in the hamlet of Squarzieri di Casaloldo

==== Catholicism ====
Religious practice was common and widespread among all social classes: men, women and children attended not only Sunday Mass, but collectively experienced liturgical rites and festivals in the knowledge that the foundation of social life was to be recognized in the religious dimension. Participation in processions, rosaries, tridua, imposition of sacraments and other forms of worship was frequent, especially since the Council of Trent had prescribed, recommended and encouraged attendance at such practices.

The rise of the industrial-type society in the century just past favored in the Upper Mantuan the development of a pragmatic and concrete mentality that proved to be, at the same time, increasingly secular. It weakened, bringing it almost to the point of disappearance, the religious conception of the world, handed down by countless generations until the early twentieth century, for which every period of the year and every hour of the day were regulated and sanctified by cult practices. The sacred did not pertain only to man in his relationship with heaven, but permeated the entire sensible reality, the earth and living beings.

==== Ecclesiastical history ====
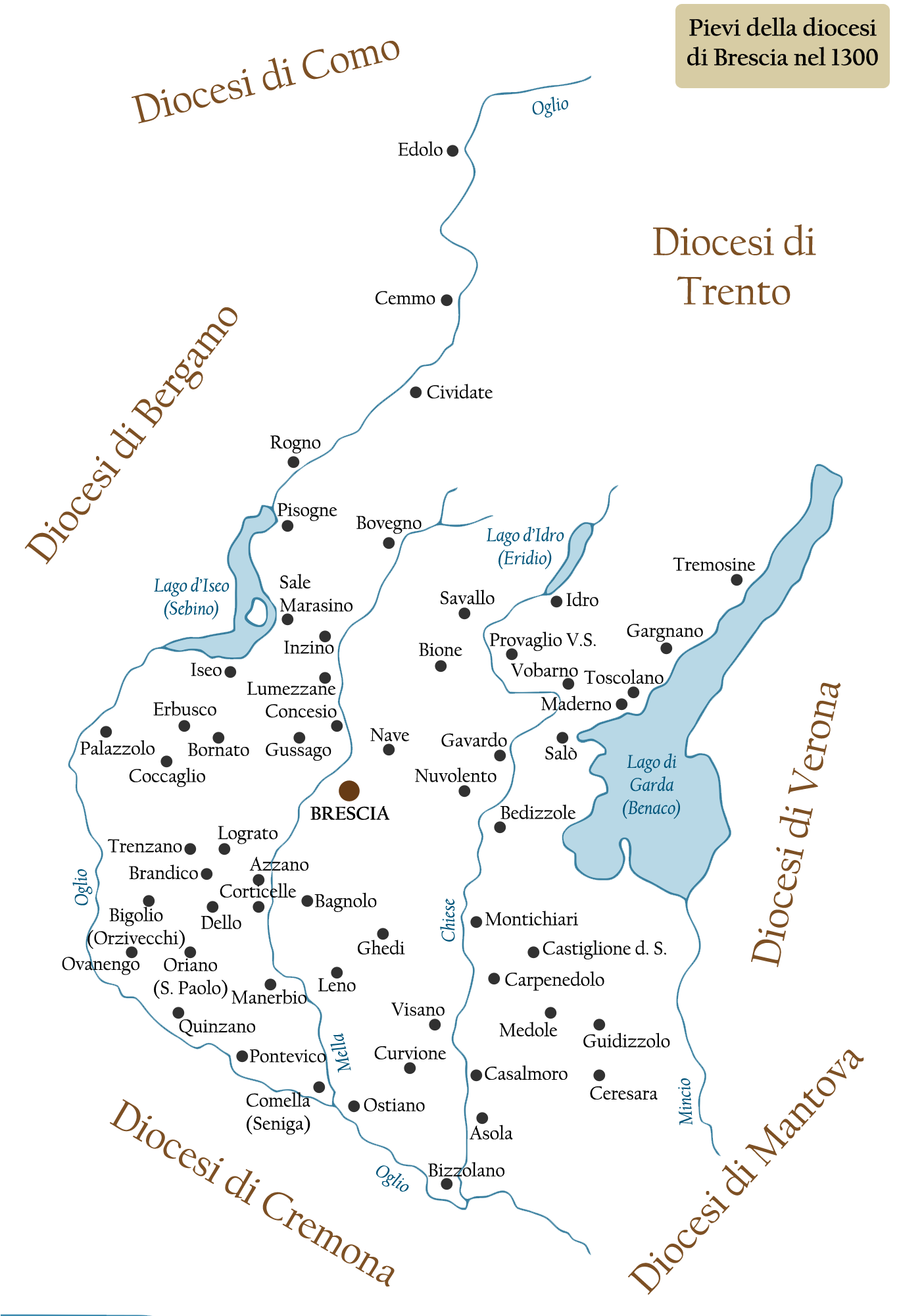
Parishes of the diocese of Brescia in the 1300s.

The whole area of Upper Mantua today belongs to the diocese of Mantua, although until the late 18th or early 19th century most of the Upper Mantuan parishes were part of the diocese of Brescia.

In particular, the lands corresponding today to Castiglione delle Stiviere, Solferino, Medole, Guidizzolo, Castel Goffredo, Casaloldo, Casalmoro, Asola, Mariana Mantovana, Redondesco, Acquanegra sul Chiese, Canneto sull'Oglio Casalromano until the end of the eighteenth century were parishes included in the diocese of Brescia, in part only delegated from the sixteenth century onward to that of Mantua, due to the expansion of the Marquisate of Mantua.

In diplomas issued by kings of Italy or emperors of the Holy Roman Empire from the 11th century onward to the Church of Mantua, it is found that only a few centers of the Upper Mantua area were the seat of parishes belonging to the Mantuan diocese: these are in particular Cavriana, San Cassiano di Cavriana, Volta Mantovana, Goito, San Martino Gusnago, and a place now disappeared called "Capo di Tartaro," located at the time probably between Mosio, Redondesco and Marcaria, i.e., near the border with the Brescian area.

In earlier times, however, many among these localities had hosted substantial properties of the Brescia monastery of Santa Giulia, thus also remaining under the influence of Brescia: these are the courtyards of Cavriana, Goito, San Martino Gusnago. In the Middle Ages, on the other hand, the parishes of Asola, Bizzolano di Canneto sull'Oglio, Casalmoro, Medole, Guidizzolo, and Castiglione delle Stiviere belonged fully to the diocese of Brescia; disputed between Brescia and Mantua was the jurisdiction over the parish of San Martino Gusnago.

Through a series of expansions occurring between 1785 and 1820, the territory of the diocese of Mantua reached an extension that was almost as large as it is today, engulfing, among others, the territories to the north of the city already included in the diocese of Brescia. It is presumable that these expansions, which occurred during a period of time characterized by a policy of religious suppressions and therefore certainly not favorable to the Church, such as the Napoleonic era, were the expression of a desire on the part of the civil authority to make administrative boundaries and ecclesiastical boundaries coincide as much as possible in order to operate a greater control over the activity of the diocese. The Virgilian diocesan territory, previously very small, comes in this period to take on contours that bring it closer to the scope of the province, with a doubling of the area of its own pertaining.

In 1785 the parishes, formerly belonging to Brescia and in some cases subject to Asola - the center of a small area independent of any other diocese until 1818 - of the territories of Acquanegra, Casalromano, Castel Goffredo, Mariana and Redondesco became part of the diocese. In 1787 Brescia ceded to Mantua the parishes of the towns of Castiglione delle Stiviere, Guidizzolo, Medole, Solferino, Canneto, and Ostiano. Having acquired Gazoldo from Cremona in 1803, in 1818 the parishes of the entire 17th administrative district were aggregated to Mantua: Asola with its hamlets, Acquafredda, Casalmoro, Casaloldo and Casalpoglio.

After these enlargements, the territory of the diocese of Mantua differs from that of the province at that time only in the absence of a part of the Volta district: Monzambano and Ponti sul Mincio, still belonging to the diocese of Verona: these two parishes are acquired by Mantua only in 1977. Today also the parishes of the now Cremonese municipalities of Ostiano and Volongo are included in the San Carlo Borromeo (Asola) vicariate of the Diocese of Mantua.

- Confraternities
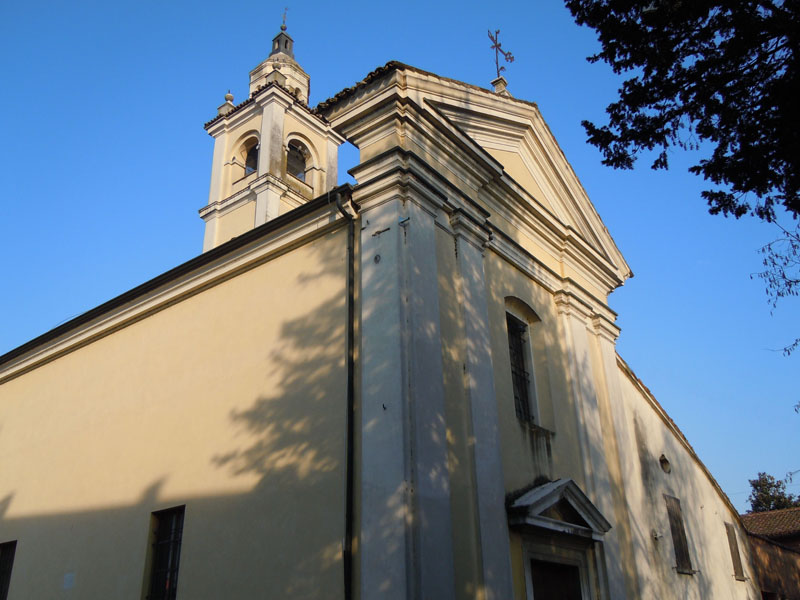
  Castel Goffredo, Church of the Disciplines, home of the Confraternity of the Disciples in the 16th century

In the upper Mantua territory, the spread of confraternities began quite early: the statutes of the "Congregation of Mercy of Castel Goffredo" date back to 1288, and the presence of a house of the Humiliati, a religious congregation devoted to prayer and wool processing, to the 13th century. During the 15th century, the White Discipleship movement acquired a widespread diffusion in the Brescian territory. At the time of the visit of St. Charles Borromeo (1580) there is practically no community in that part of Upper Mantua subject to the diocese of Brescia that does not have one or more Discipline schools. The drafting of the statutes of the confraternity of Canneto sull'Oglio also dates back to the 15th century. In ecclesiastically Brescian Upper Mantua the Disciplines were present in Asola, Castiglione, Solferino, Medole, Castel Goffredo, Casalmoro, Casaloldo, Acquanegra, Redondesco, Mariana, and Canneto.

At the end of the 15th century, the confraternity of the Blessed Sacrament was founded at the Brescia cathedral; from this date onward, similar institutions spread throughout the diocese, with schools of the Blessed Sacrament present in most of the Upper Mantua parishes from the late 15th-early 16th century. Apparently, in the origins and spread of lay confraternities - Disciplines, Blessed Sacrament - a certain role was played by preaching to the people carried out by mendicant orders such as Franciscans and Dominicans.

- Religious autonomies

Upper Mantua as a whole never enjoyed specific independence from the dioceses of the surrounding cities of Brescia, Mantua, and Verona. However, the parishes of some centers, roughly between the 16th and early 19th centuries, while belonging to their respective dioceses, were in essence detached from the bishop's jurisdiction, with a decidedly autonomous identity, forming almost small dioceses in their own right, especially for certain periods. This is the case of Asola and Castiglione delle Stiviere with respect to the ordinary of Brescia, of Gazoldo degli Ippoliti with respect to that of Mantua. Castiglione and Gazoldo because of the presence of families ruling feuds that were also politically autonomous, Asola because of a special protectorate obtained from the Republic of Venice. Gazoldo was declared nullius dioecesis, i.e., not belonging to any diocese, Asola was a commenda and then it too became nullius diocesis and was ruled by a bishop - reason why the Asolan parish church bears the ancient title of cathedral -, Castiglione was a collegiate church.

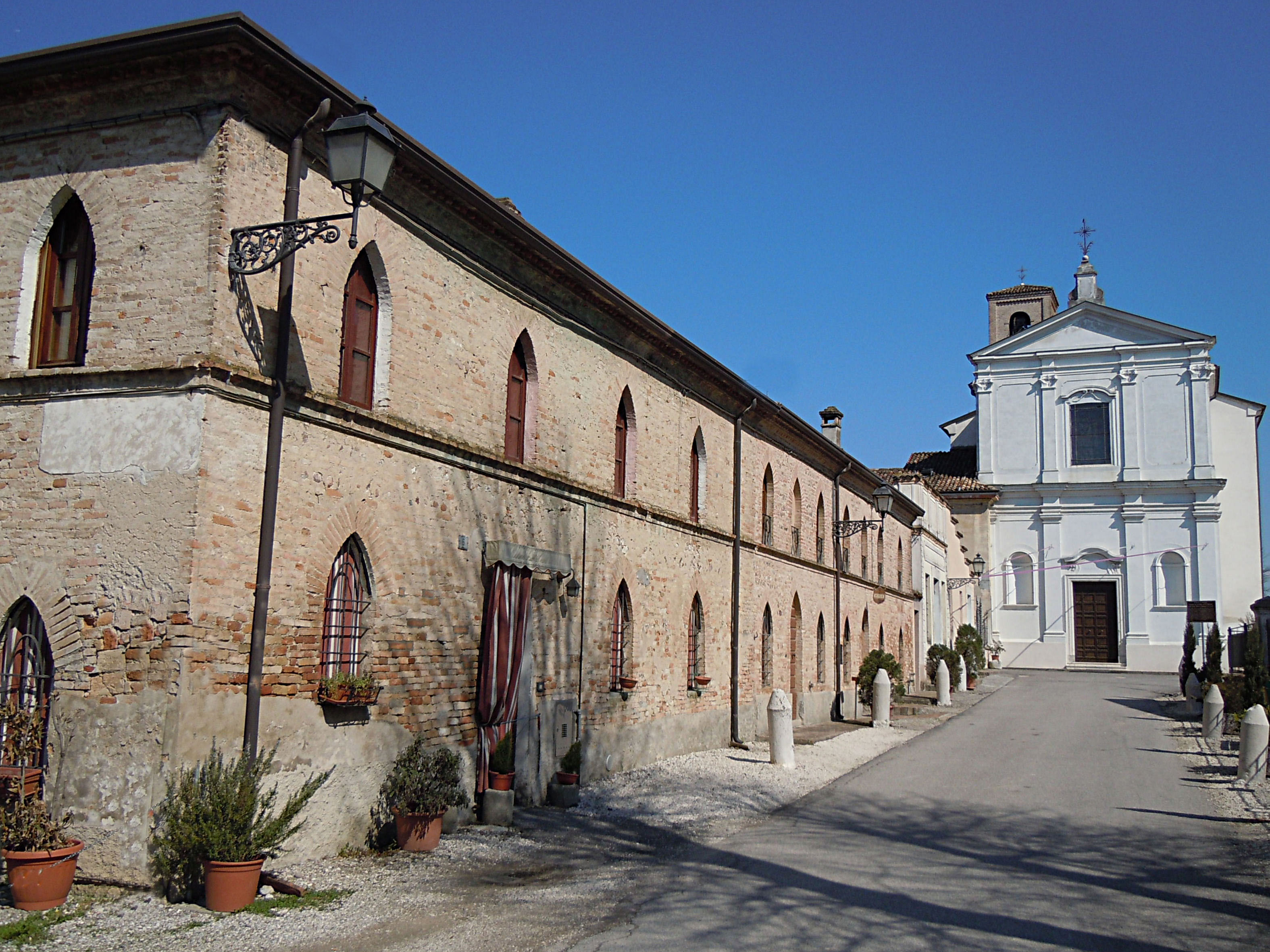
Parish Church of San Martino Gusnago

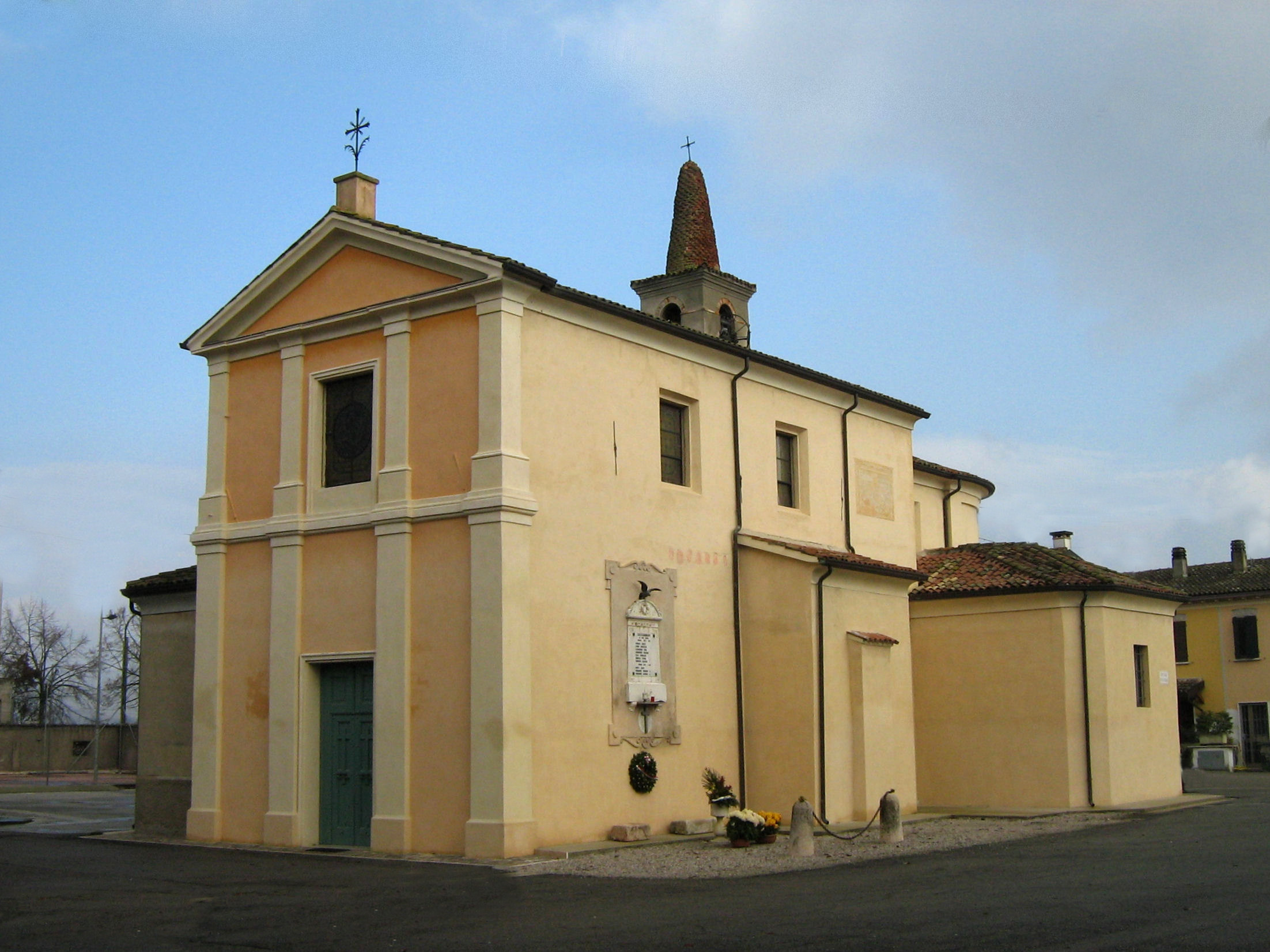
Castelgrimaldo parish church

==== Judaism ====
Upper Mantua has never been a land of settlement of Jewish communities - apart from the far from negligible cases of Castel Goffredo and Ostiano -, unlike what happened from the late Middle Ages onward, under the rule of the Gonzaga family, for Mantua itself or for other places in the province, such as Bozzolo, Viadana or Sabbioneta.

In Castiglione delle Stiviere, Asola and the adjacent territories from the fifteenth century onward only individuals with their families settled, carrying out interest-bearing loans in the banks providing loans at an interest or dealing with the collection of taxes and gabelles for the local lords.

Detested for such occupations by the local population, they often suffered violence in times of political turmoil: this is what happened, for example, to the tobacco contractor of Prince Ferdinand II of Castiglione during the revolt against the Gonzaga of Castiglione in the last years of the seventeenth century. Thus, even in Upper Mantua, Jews, though small in number, were poorly tolerated and separated from the Christian community in the past.

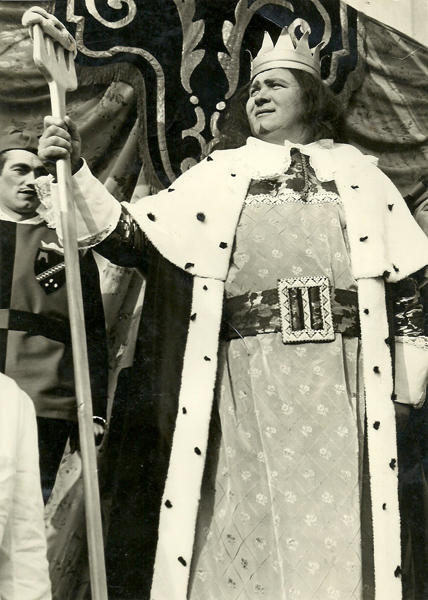
Re gnocco (Dumpling King), Feb. 7, 1964, Carnival of Castel Goffredo

=== Traditions and folklore ===
The Alto Mantovano area boasts ancient traditions:

- St. Martin's Day (November 11)
- Saint Lucy (December 13)
- Saint Anthony the Great (January 17)
- The bonfire (burièl) of the Old Woman (Epiphany)
- Carnival (last Tuesday of Carnival)

=== Politics ===
==== Territorial aggregations ====
===== Upper Mantua =====
The territory of the morainic hills has embarked on a path of territorial identification, arriving at the signing of a Framework Agreement Protocol in 2007 by the institutional subjects of the Upper Mantua and Lower Garda Bresciano territories. Involved are the municipalities of: Castel Goffredo, Castiglione delle Stiviere, Cavriana, Goito, Guidizzolo, Medole, Monzambano, Ponti sul Mincio, Solferino, Volta Mantovana.

===== Asolano =====
The municipalities of the western portion of the Mantuan territory, marked by the basin of the Chiese River, which runs from Casalmoro down to the confluence of the Oglio River, just south of Canneto, i.e., Asola, Canneto, Casalmoro, Casaloldo, Mariana Mantovana, Piubega, Redondesco, have begun a process of jointly defining development goals. The municipal administrations, with the support of the Province of Mantua, through the definition of the Memorandum of Understanding "Between the Eagle and the Lion lands of frontier and communication," activated the construction of a strategic plan for the area.

== Culture ==
Linguistically, religiously, politically, architecturally, and in terms of settlement, Upper Mantua possesses features that distinguish it from the rest of the province. Following a period of limited research, the history, art, and culture of the region have been the subject of further study in recent decades.

=== UNESCO World Heritage Sites ===
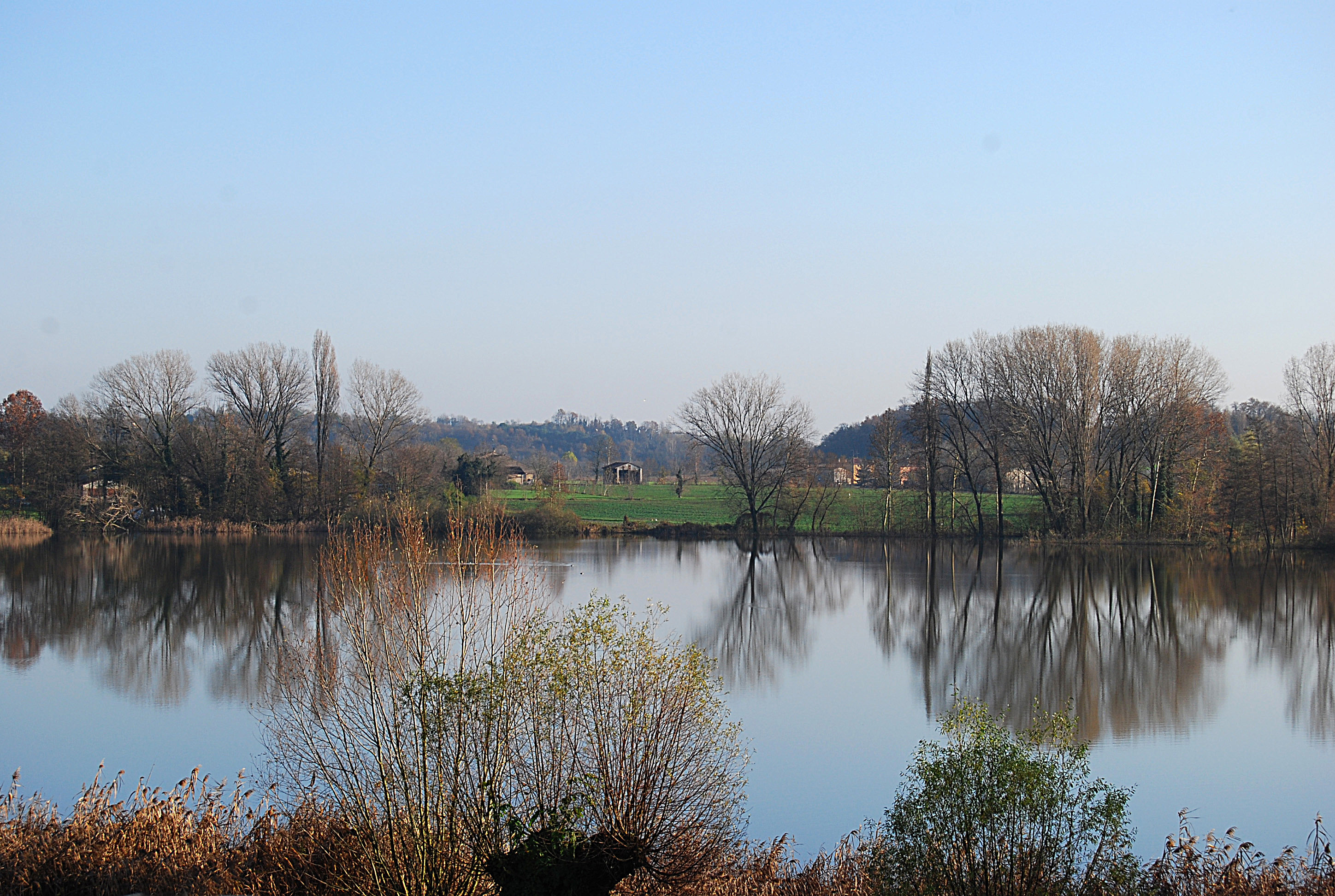
Castellaro Lagusello

The Bronze Age pile-dwelling stations of Castellaro Lagusello and Bande di Cavriana were inscribed in the year 2011 in the list of UNESCO World Heritage Sites among the ancient alpine settlements.

These are a type of Bronze Age settlements located in wet environments, such as lake, marsh or river areas (Garda littoral and alpine or intermoraine basins). At that time, the Lake Garda area presented itself as a crossroads for contacts between the transalpine and Mediterranean areas: exchange relations with continental Europe were strong. The structural models of these settlements, which were particularly numerous throughout the Garda basin, presented two basic types, required by the particular environmental situation: the pile dwelling and the reclamation. The former consisted of a dense deck supporting a habitable suspended platform with associated huts; the latter consisted of layers of timber and inert fills capable of making a marshy terrain dry and habitable.

The locality of Bande di Cavriana corresponds to the reservoir, now almost completely silted up, of the basin of a small intramoraine lake. On its shores, at the beginning of the Bronze Age - precisely around 2040 B.C. - a vast pile-dwelling settlement was built and developed that is considered, with those of Barche di Solferino and Polada di Lonato del Garda, one of the oldest in the Po Valley area. It was frequented until the beginning of the Middle Bronze Age (c. 1600 B.C.) when it was abandoned and the pile-dwelling structures collapsed by swamping. The same site was re-frequented after a few decades by partially utilizing the remains of the previous facility and completing the work with a stratified reclamation, such that the swamped ground became habitable. Thus, that of Bande is one of the few settlements that is characterized by the presence of both settlement types, pile-dwelling and reclamation: an almost uninterrupted frequentation for at least eight centuries, through all the Bronze Age Po Valley phases. The site was finally abandoned during the 13th century B.C. The settlement of Castellaro Lagusello, on the other hand, was established at the beginning of the Middle Bronze Age (c. 1650 BC), almost simultaneously with the setting of the second settlement of the village of Bande di Cavriana; the village of Castellaro, however, lasted until c. 1150 BC.

=== Art ===
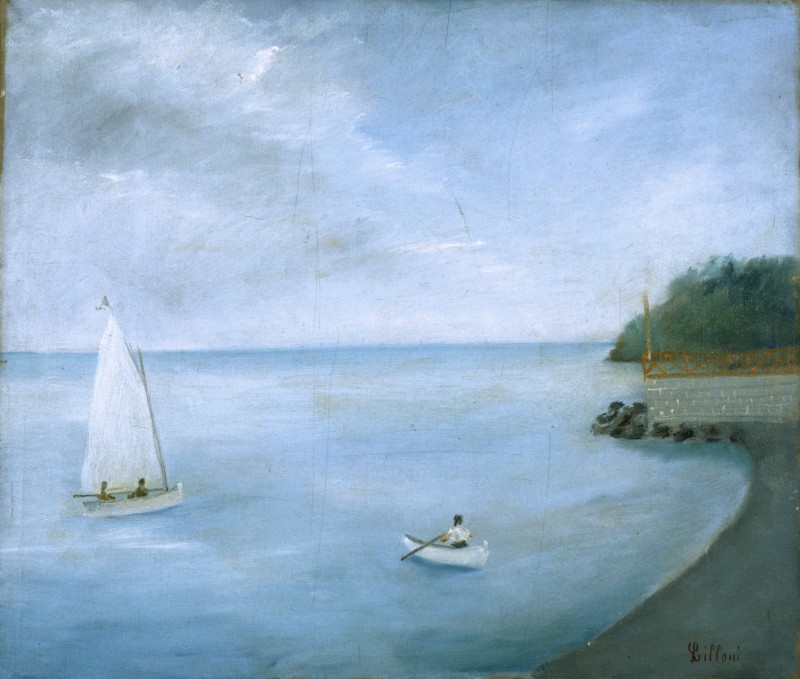
Umberto Lilloni, Paesaggio di Lavagna, 1934 (Art collection of Fondazione Cariplo)

In the Upper Mantuan territory, in a recent time, art and, specifically, painting, took on a supralocal dimension. A remarkable artistic season was then realized, in which landscape painting illuminated and gave aesthetic appearance to these evocative places, culminating in the so-called Lombard Chiarismo.

The period of that artistic production that originated from or was linked to this territory is that which, roughly speaking, stretches between 1859, in the aftermath of the Battle of Solferino and San Martino, and the 1880s.

The movement begins with the post-Risorgimento efforts of Carlo Ademollo (Florence, 1824-1911) and Giuseppe Nodari (Castiglione delle Stiviere, 1841-1898). It then passes through the Scapigliatura experience of Virgilio Ripari (Asola, 1843 - Milan, 1902) and the perspective painting of Domenico Pesenti (Medole, 1843 - Mantua, 1918) to dwell on the Divisionist and post-scapigliato naturalism of Vindizio Nodari Pesenti (Medole, 1879 - Mantua, 1961), Archimede Bresciani (Gazoldo, 1881 - Milan, 1939), and Mario Lomini (Redondesco, 1887-1948).

Subsequently came the period of Chiarismo, with aesthetic associations between Medole and Castiglione. In the first half of the twentieth century, Upper Mantua, and in particular Castel Goffredo and Castiglione delle Stiviere, were the favorite meeting and artistic gathering places of the Mantuan painters who were part of the artistic movement called "Lombard Chiarismo," who left an important trace of the area in their paintings. They had elected Castiglionese professor Oreste Marini (Castel Goffredo, 1909 - Castiglione delle Stiviere, 1992) as their teacher, and part of the group were, among others, painters Maddalena Nodari (Castel Goffredo, 1915 - Rome, 2004), Umberto Lilloni (Milan, 1898-1980) and Angelo Del Bon (Milan, 1898 - Desio, 1952), but also Giuseppe Angelo Facciotto (Cavriana, 1904 - Mantua, 1945), Carlo Malerba (Bastida Pancarana, 1896 - Milan, 1954), Ezio Mutti (Castiglione delle Stiviere, 1906-1987).

Chiarismo consists of painting that entrusts to an emotive and moving sign the vibrant luminosity that nature can emit to the eye. It is a group of painters who, between the early 1930s and the early 1950s, devoted themselves to updating the archaist horizon that inspired all the more established artists on the national scene.

However, the part of the territory that stretches between the southern shores of Lake Garda and the Mantuan plain, enclosed to the east by the Mincio River and to the west by the Chiese, an evocative habitat with outstanding natural and scenic features, also became, in the same years, a kind of rediscovered Arcadia, the object of soothing painting.

The amphitheater of the morainic hills, with its gentle slopes, is modified, idealized, and becomes color and poetry in the canvases of Mantuan artists such as Arturo Cavicchini (Ostiglia, 1907 - Mantua, 1942), Alessandro Dal Prato (Roncoferraro, 1909 - Guidizzolo, 2002), Giuseppe Fierino Lucchini (Stradella di San Giorgio di Mantova, 1907 - Casalmaggiore, 2001), and Aldo Bergonzoni (Mantua, 1899 - Padua, 1976).

In the decade after 1945, ferments also emerged here that, in the artistic field, oriented the country toward a contemporary identity, in overcoming a bucolic and happy vision of nature, and changed the horizon of painting-making. From Franco Ferlenga (Castiglione delle Stiviere, 1916-2004) to Danilo Guidetti (Castiglione delle Stiviere, 1928-1990), landscape painting evolves by going beyond the representation of nature as spectacle.

The last emotions of this artistic path linked to Upper Mantua result in surreal operations, in the search for interaction between art and language, and postmodern trends, in which originality subjects the already available aesthetic material to variation: Franco Bassignani (Guidizzolo, 1942), Eristeo Banali (Mantua, 1950), Adriano Castelli (Asola, 1955).

=== Museums ===
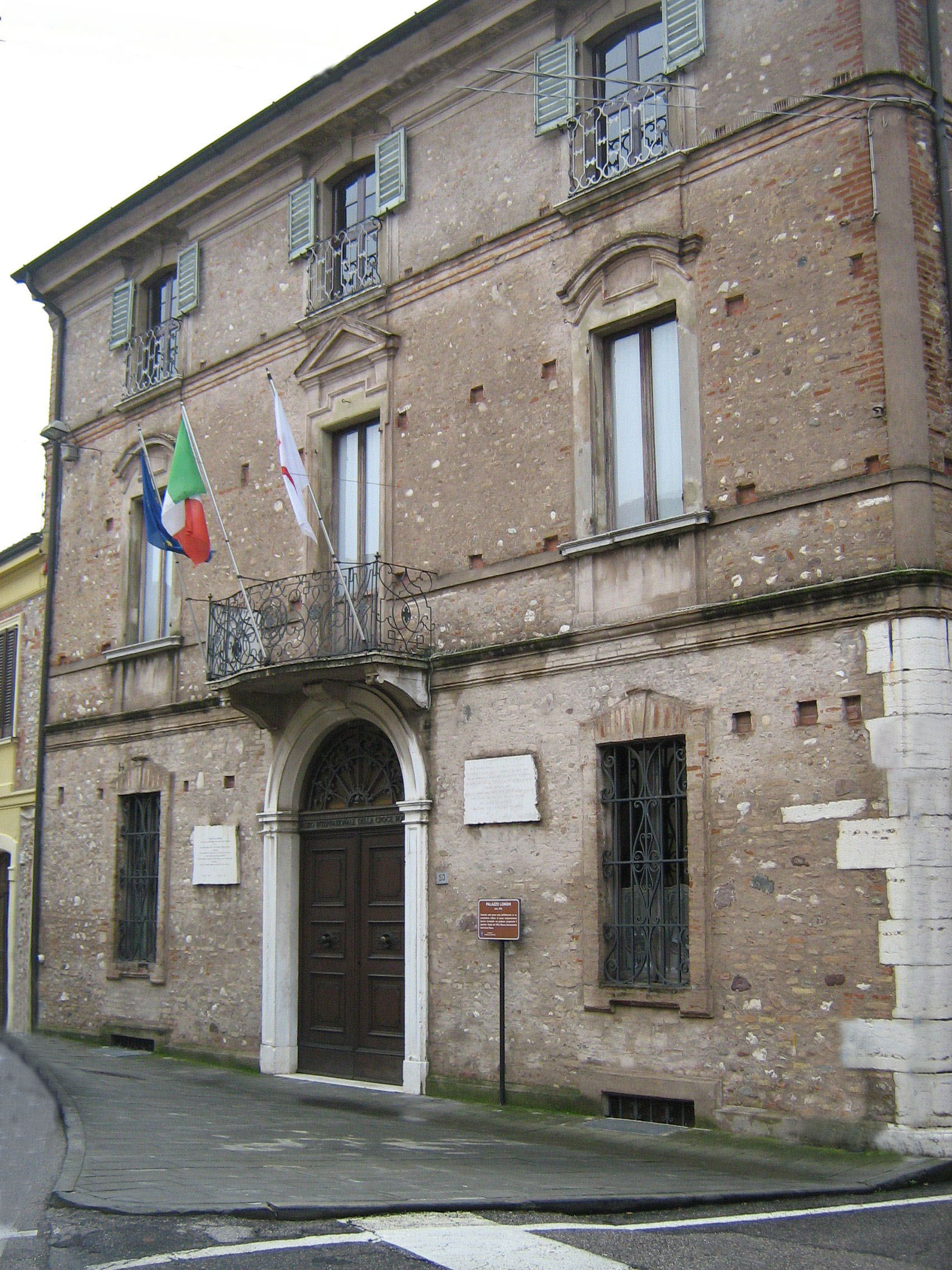
Castiglione delle Stiviere, International Red Cross Museum

The museums in the area almost all fall under the Mantua Museum System. The most important are:

- Museo Internazionale della Croce Rossa and Museo Storico Aloisiano at the Collegio Vergini di Gesù in Castiglione delle Stiviere
- Historical Museum of the Risorgimento in Solferino.
- Museo archeologico dell'alto mantovano in Cavriana
- MAM Museo d'Arte Moderna e Contemporanea dell'Alto Mantovano in Gazoldo degli Ippoliti
- MAST Castel Goffredo in Castel Goffredo
- Civic art collection in Medole

=== Libraries and archives ===
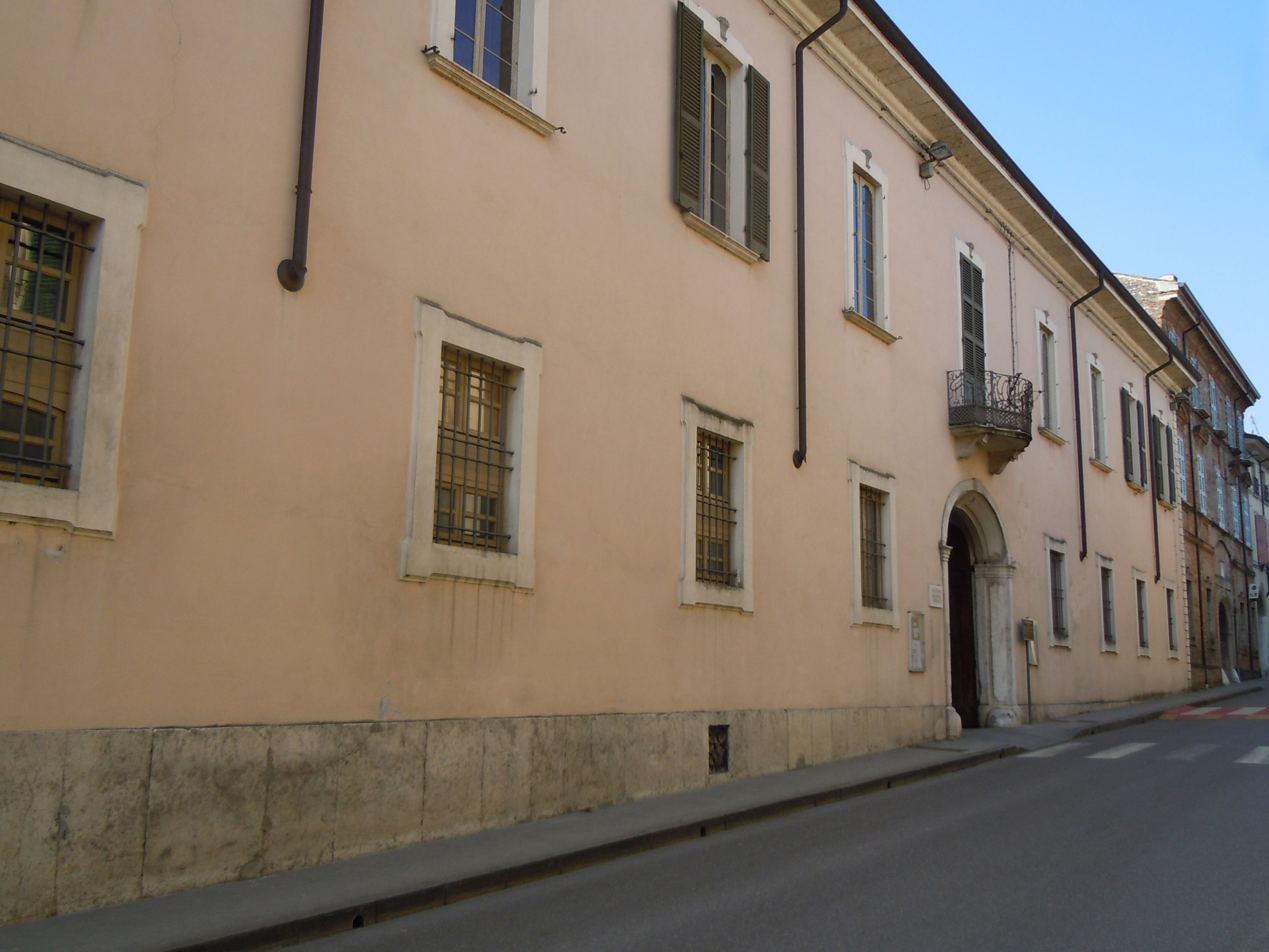
Castiglione delle Stiviere, Palazzo Pastore, home of the municipal library

The various municipal libraries of Upper Mantua are part of the libraries of the province of Mantua, particularly the Sistema Bibliotecario Ovest Mantovano, and are able to lend books and multimedia, including from other libraries in the province, through interlibrary loan. A computer network connects all libraries in West Mantua with each other, and with the remaining ones in the province of Mantua, Brescia and Cremona, making them part of one large virtual library. One can consult the online catalog from home and check the availability of the document sought. Management procedures for libraries and users are also computerized. Interloan service is a well-established reality that guarantees reading and information even to users residing in isolated municipalities.

The Municipal Library of Castiglione delle Stiviere often stands out due to its large book collection and valuable location.

The municipalities of Castiglione delle Stiviere, Medole, Cavriana, Solferino and Ponti sul Mincio have initiated a draft convention for the joint management of what has been called the Archival Service of Upper Mantua. The municipal administrations of Asola, Canneto sull'Oglio, Casalmoro and Casalromano, considering the value and size of their archival heritage, also initiated a unified archival policy, investing in the overall realization of the archival service through a form of cooperation.

=== Cuisine ===
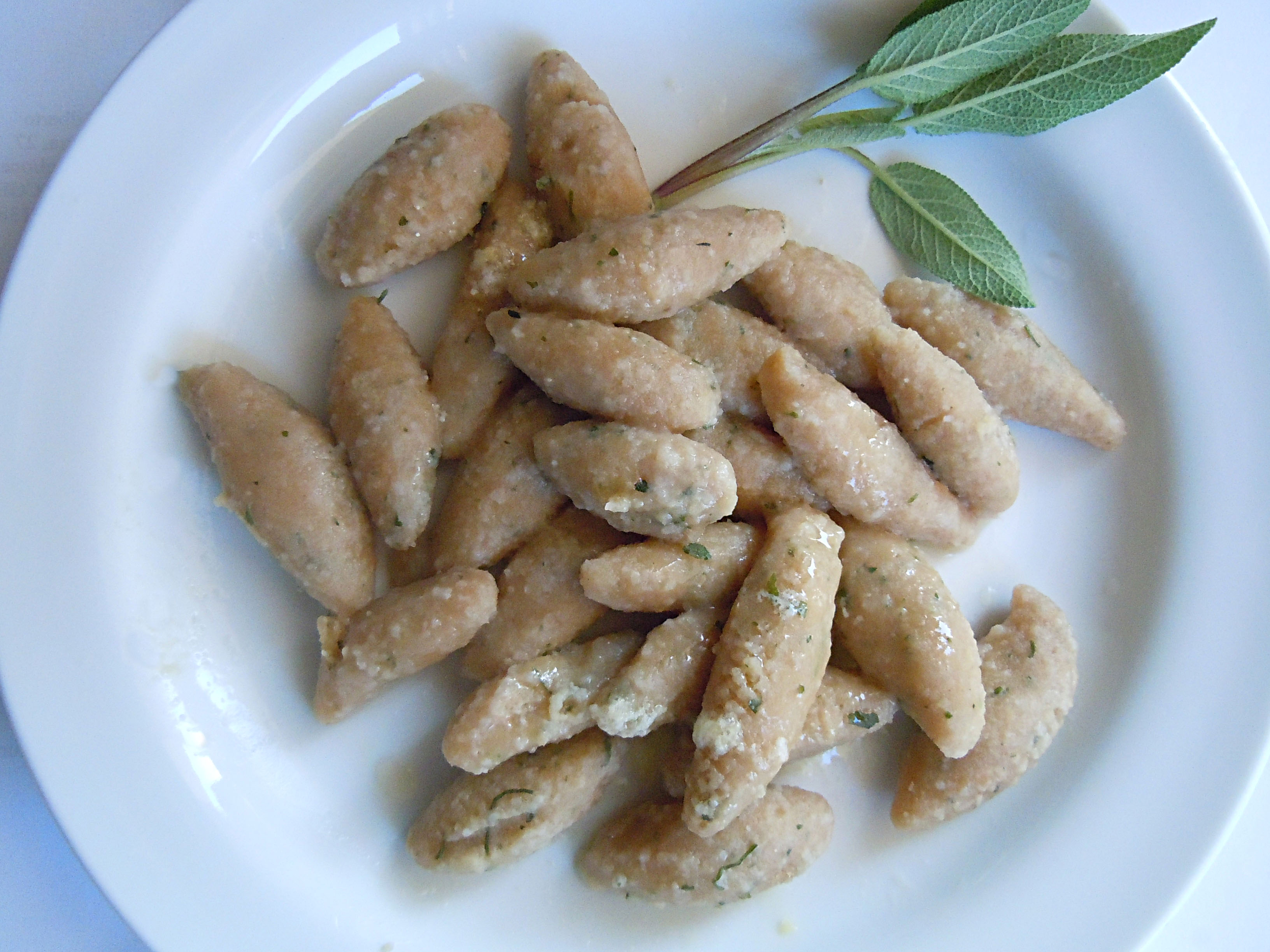
Capunsei

Broadly speaking, the typical food products of the Upper Mantuan area do not differ from those of the entire Po Valley. More specifically, the local gastronomy is the result of the combination of the culinary art of Mantua, appreciated all over the world, and the more genuine traditions of the morainic hill area.

== Anthropogenic geography ==
Examining the history of the upper Mantuan territory, one can easily detect the distinction between the central core, more or less corresponding to the ancient diocese, committee and jurisdiction of the medieval commune of Mantua, and a complex crown of territories formerly non-Mantuan, and later acquired mainly through the Gonzaga, but which never lost their alterity from the ancient Mantuan root, in culture, language, religion, but also in settlement patterns and rural building typology.

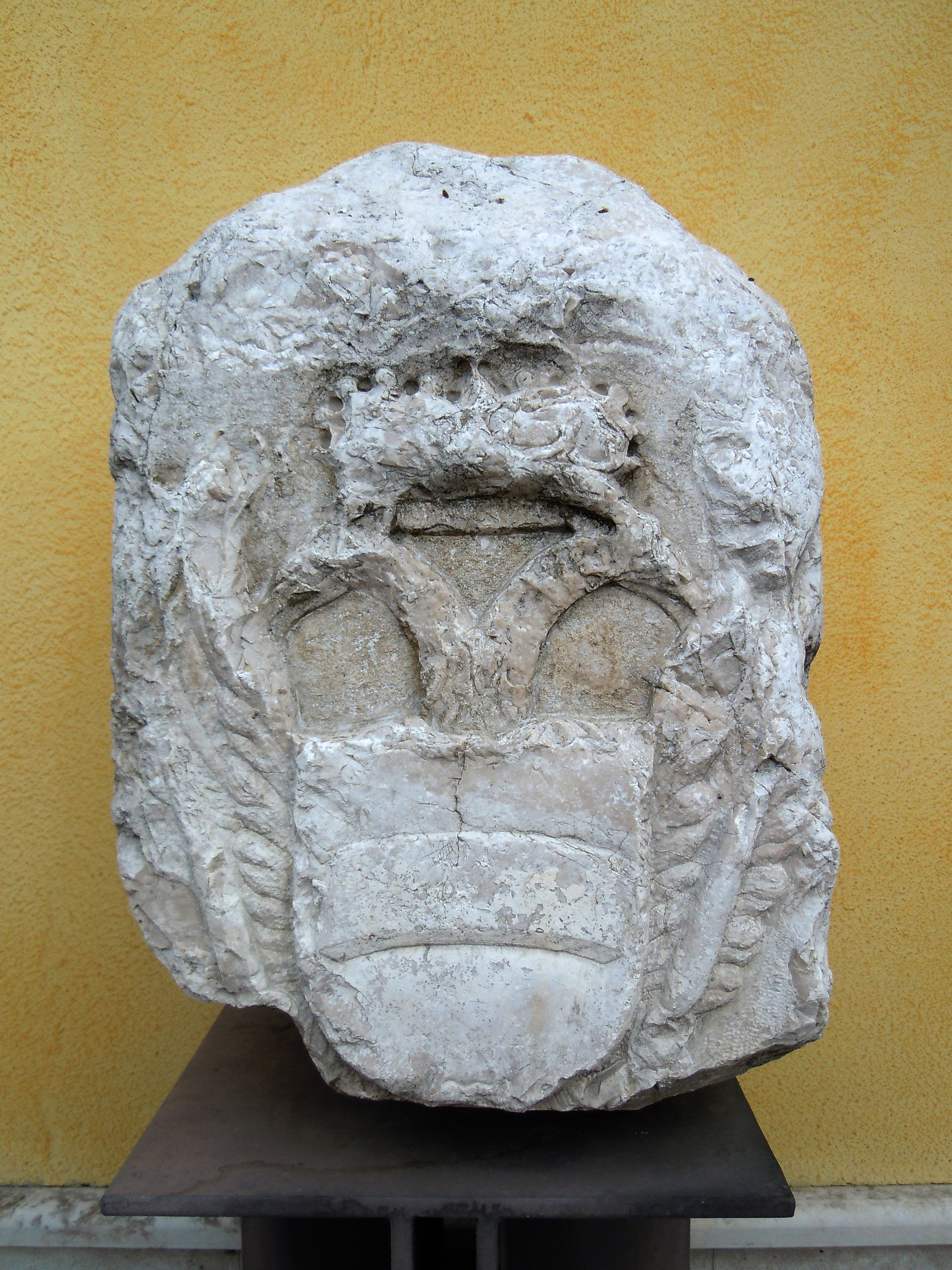
Castel Goffredo, Piazza Castelvecchio, fragment of Austrian boundary stone from 1756 delimiting the Republic of Venice and the Empire of Austria

The high dry plain, that is, the area north of the Postumia, either because of the obvious stability of the water regime, or because of the greater evidence of the centuriate network, or again because of an ancient non-"mantovanity" - areas partly linked to the Veronese and Brescian agri in Roman times and dependent on dioceses and monasteries of the latter cities in the early Middle Ages and beyond -, either still because of a different ethnic culture rooted in greater cultivation difficulties - hence greater poverty, greater exposure to barbarian raids and later wars, land therefore open at once and isolated -, manifests, legible even today, an archaicness and continuity, not only in the territorial plot, but also in the rarefaction and isolation of settlement nodes.

The typically Mantuan agricultural courtyard has not succeeded there; instead, the small nucleus dominates with strong echoes of fortified structure, visible, for example, in the so-called "dovecotes": it is the typical closed courtyard of the high plain. It is in the same area that turns out to be another interesting element of continuity with the Roman centuriation, which combines ancient agrarian myths with the Christian tradition; the numerous small chapels, frequent in much of the countryside, are particularly widespread and coincide there with the intersections between the limites; elements clearly substituting either gromatic cippus or sacred trees.

The territories of Upper Mantua that were acquired by Mantua in relatively recent times present, from the point of view of the natural environment, hydric-pedological structure and older historical roots, similar features to those located on the axis of the Postumia from Goito to Redondesco - Ceresara, San Martino Gusnago, Piubega, Gazoldo -, which belonged instead to the Mantuan diocese and to the jurisdictional sphere of the city municipality first and the Gonzaga seigniorial state later: the former, however, also reveal their substantial foreignness to Mantua in the absence, or reduced presence, of large rural courtyards and the greater importance of urban-type centers.

This particular situation precisely favored in Upper Mantua the formation of small urban centers, almost mini-capitals of rural substratum, although endowed, in the late Renaissance, with significant urban-architectural interventions: Castel Goffredo, Castiglione, Solferino.

The original diversity thus persists in settlement patterns, with clear divergence of these semi-autonomous states from the rest of the Mantuan area, characterized by the tendency to concentration in nuclei, poverty of crops and the persistence of a culture, including productive-building, of an archaic type.

=== The rural courtyard ===
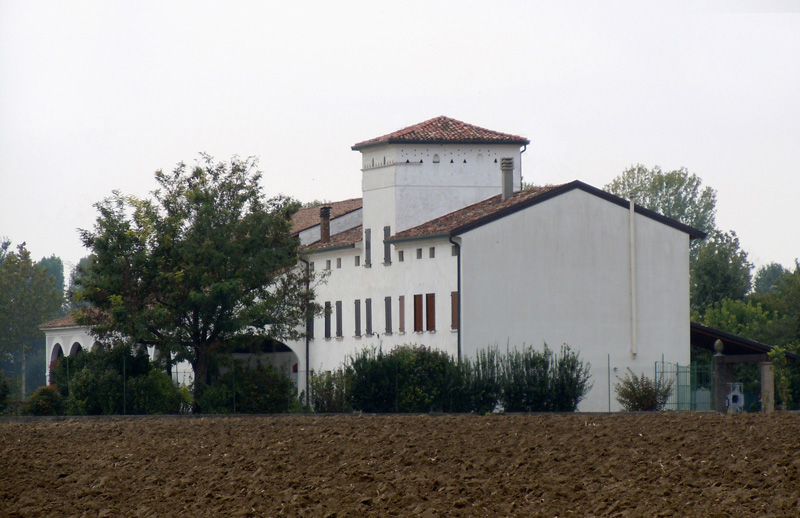
Rural courtyard in Upper Mantua

As far as rural architecture is concerned, there are two prevailing typologies, according to a dichotomy between hilly and flat areas that also affects other aspects of the Alto Mantovano: the "contrade" of the moraine hills and the closed courtyards of the high plain, mostly characterized by medium-sized farms with a land structure not exceeding 30 ha. The small rural farms of the hills, built with river pebbles and open to the countryside, were replaced by the large estates of the vast and fertile plain, gathered around the farmyard and enclosed by walls and brick buildings, functional building patterns intended in the past to meet various needs: a large manor house in the center to house the eventual owner or administrator; rural dwellings for the families of workers; rooms set up for the storage of cold cuts, wine, cheese; stables and barns in which to store work tools, stow hay, grain, and guard livestock.

The so-called closed courtyards, which are particularly widespread in the flat plateau of Upper Mantua, seem to highlight in their complete spatial enclosure an avowedly defensive matrix, which is also noticeable in the open courtyards of the lower plain, which, consisting of buildings separated from each other, are nevertheless often surrounded by moats or perimeter walls. About the origin of rural courtyards, especially closed ones, which proposed isolation features similar to those of fortified castle-fences, a reuse of military architecture for agricultural purposes as well cannot be ruled out. From the military complexes, rural architecture seems to have borrowed those elements that best lent themselves to offering guarantees of security: in addition to moats and perimeter walls, the presence of access towers and towers known as "dovecotes," with the function of storage and sighting, were added in some cases.

=== Urban planning ===
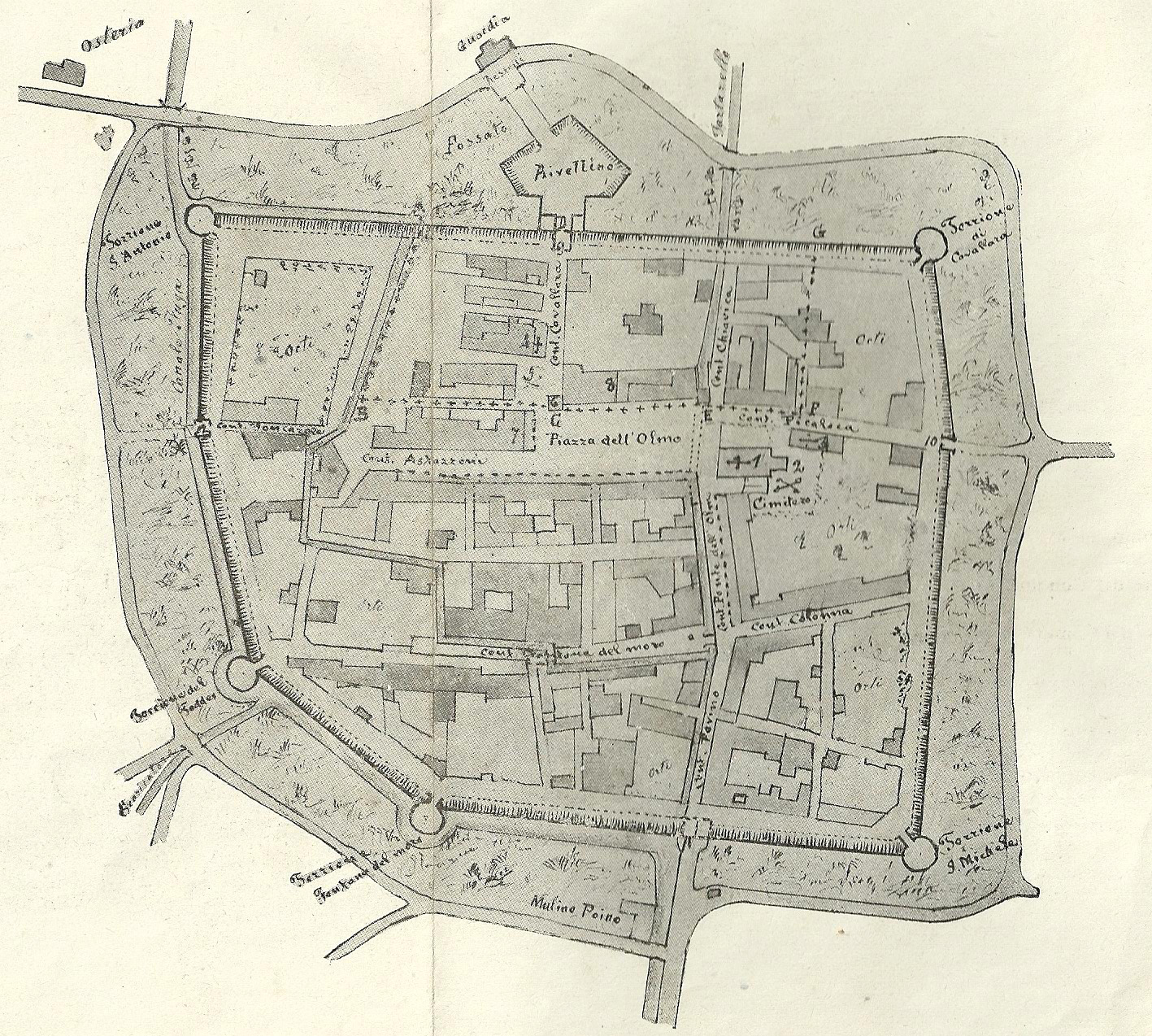
Map of Castel Goffredo, a fortress town, in the early sixteenth century

From an urban point of view, the hill towns in the territory on the border between Mantua, Brescia, and Verona were mostly medieval villages that experienced the rule of the Seignories and have, subsequently, adapted to the economic development of more recent eras. Overshadowed by a castle or its remains, rising from the top of the highest hill around which the town proper grew, they are embellished with stately villas and residences built in the refined Renaissance style that replaced fortifications and buttresses when the defensive functions of those ancient military posts disappeared.

Gonzaga's Castel Goffredo, as well as the Venetian Asola, represent lowland localities characterized by building affinities, once enclosed by bastioned walls, with a large square inside where the main church, the prince's or town hall's palace, straight streets, and long porticoes are located. The fortified element today has largely disappeared; one can get an idea of it by looking at the still walled town of Sabbioneta, located in Lower Mantua. The perimeter fortifications of Asola and Castel Goffredo, important and irreplaceable testimonies of urban and military history, were erased by constant and definitive works of decommissioning and dismantling that lasted at least until the early twentieth century. Thus disappeared bastions, walls, gates, the moats, of which rare and poorly preserved remnants and a cartographic record remain.

== Economy ==
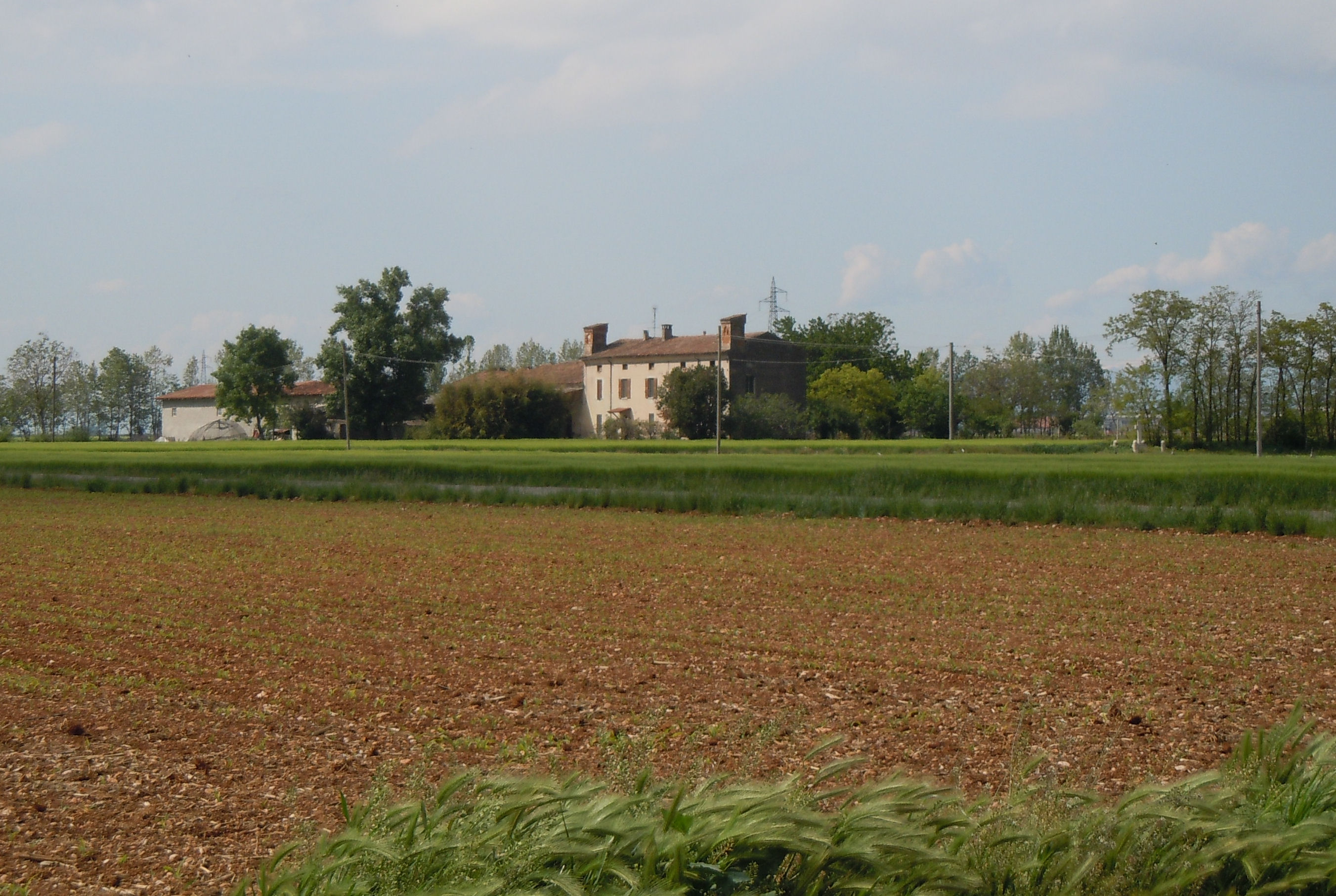
Rebecco di Guidizzolo, the surrounding countryside

The Upper Mantuan district represents an area characterized by strong socio-economic transformations that in the last twenty years are leading to radical changes in the territory, which is shifting from a strong industrial/ handicraft orientation - the "sock district" and the mechanical-iron and steel cluster Gruppo Marcegaglia Spa - to greater productive diversification: Industry and handicrafts remain, but the enhancement of typical agricultural products - Mantuan melon, Mantuan salami, wines of the moraine hills, tomatoes - and small-scale trade also appears.

== Infrastructure and transportation ==
=== Roads ===
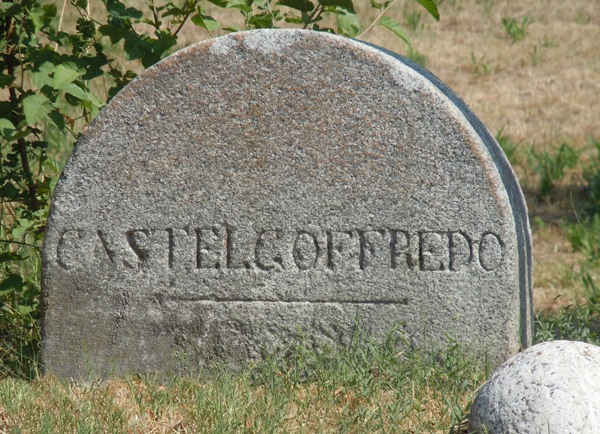
Casaloldo, road sign from the second half of the 19th century.

The main road axes are:

- State road 236 Goitese, which starts from Mantua and passes through Goito and Castiglione delle Stiviere to Brescia;
- State road 343 Asolana, which connects Parma to Castiglione delle Stiviere;
- State road 567 del Benaco that connects Desenzano del Garda to Castiglione delle Stiviere and the A4 highway.

Of some importance to the economy of the area are also some provincial roads:

- Provincial road 8, which connects Casaloldo to Pozzolengo and is also called "road of the Sock," because it crosses the textile industrial district that has Castel Goffredo at its center;
- Provincial road 1 Mantova-Asola, which, in addition to connecting with the provincial capital, also makes it possible to reach the road to Cremona in a short time from Asola and Casalromano.

Of particular historical importance is the so-called Via Postumia, so called because it follows the route of an important and strategic Roman road that connected Genoa to Aquileia; it passed at the southern limits of the upper Mantuan district, in a virtually straight section, still in existence, that crosses or skims the localities of Goito, Gazoldo, Redondesco and Mosio, and that connected Verona with Cremona. At the time of its opening in 148 B.C., it favored the development of trade with the Adriatic markets and stimulated a wider distribution of the products of this area, renowned even then for its important agricultural production. It also contributed to the Romanization of the Gallic populations settled in the territory, who were not militarily subjugated by the Romans, but rather, coming into contact with Latin culture, began to absorb its products and customs.

=== Railways ===
Only one railway line crosses the territory of Upper Mantua, the Brescia-Parma, and along it stand the Upper Mantua stations of Asola and Canneto sull'Oglio.

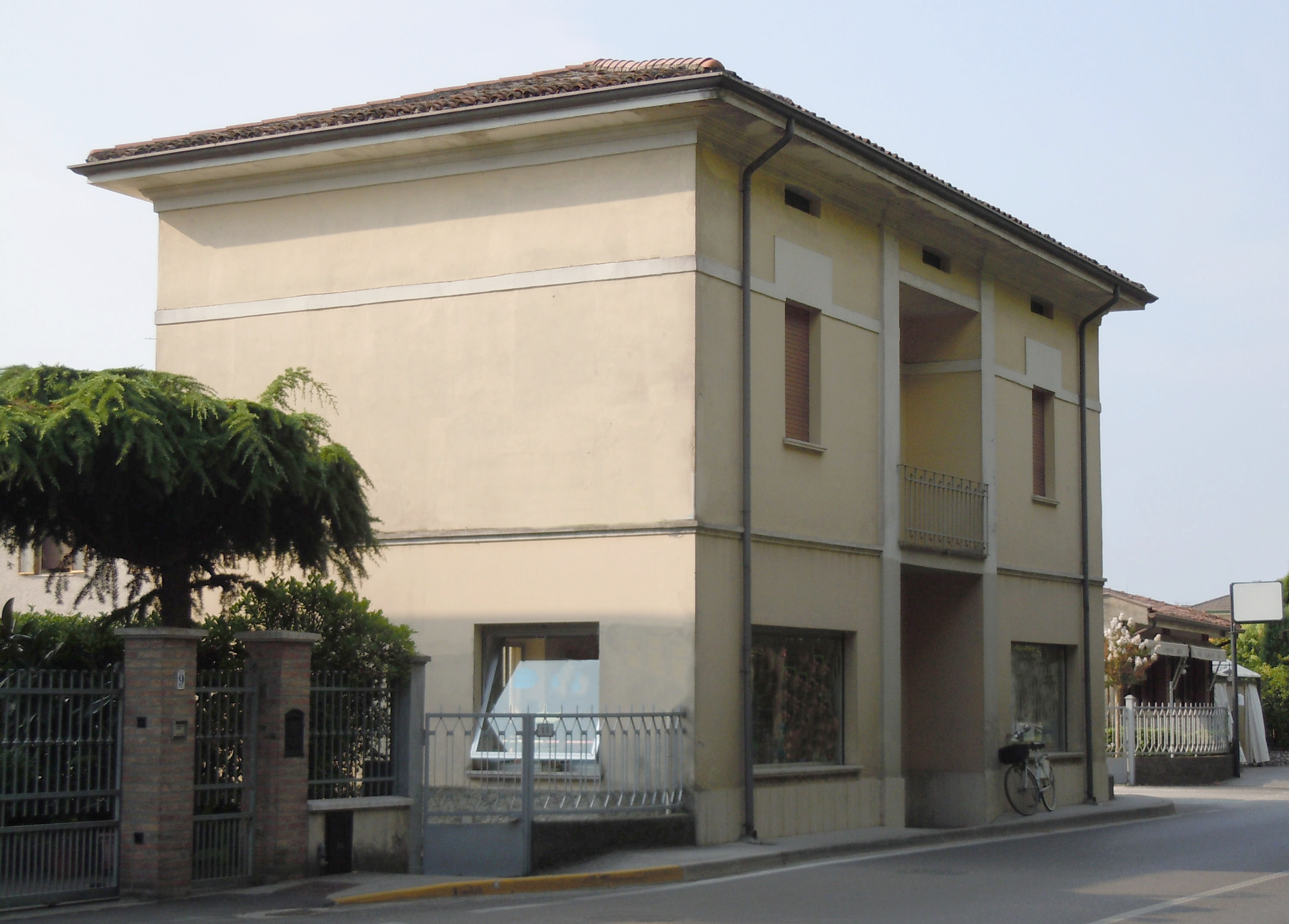
Castel Goffredo, the old streetcar station

=== Urban mobility ===
From 1930 to 1933 the Medole-Casaloldo tramway line (a branch of the Cremona-Asola tramway) was in service, with single-carriage streetcars called "Norge," connecting the lower lake Garda between Desenzano, Cremona, and Piacenza.

Intercity service is provided by the Mantua-based APAM company, which connects the various municipalities in the province and the cities of Brescia and Mantua.

=== Bike paths ===
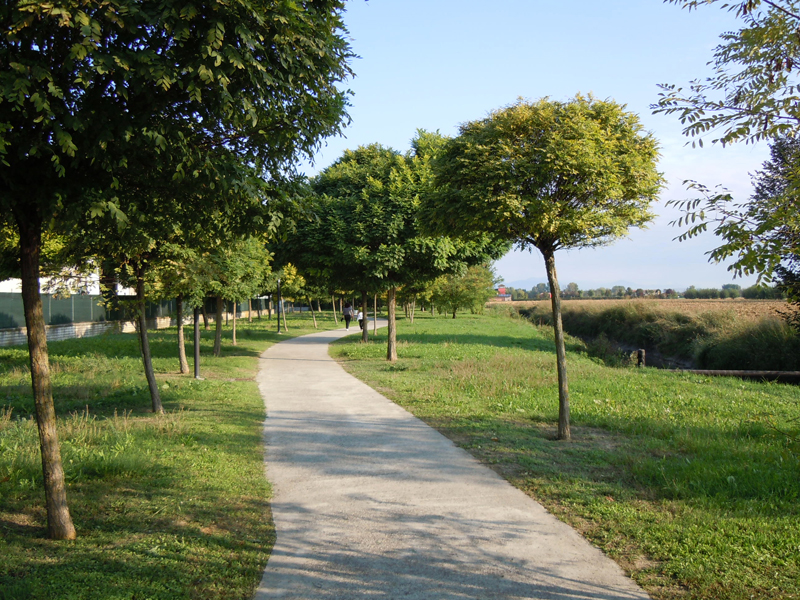
Bike path of Castel Goffredo

- Mantova-Peschiera bicycle route, which runs along the banks of the Mincio River.
- Route of the moraine hills of Upper Mantua.
- High moraine corridor.
- Low moraine corridor.
- South Oglio Park.
- Left Oglio.
- Castel Goffredo bicycle path.

== Sports ==
- Tamburello: a sport that is particularly widespread in a few narrow areas of Italy, including Upper Mantua, especially the hilly area. AT Medole and AT Ennio Guerra Castellaro are competing in the league championship of the Italian Tamburello Championship. On December 6-7-8, 2013 in the sports halls of Castel Goffredo, Casalmoro, Guidizzolo and Asola were held some matches and finals of the "1st World Indoor Tamburello Championship-Italy 2013."
- Soccer: Football Club Castiglione was promoted to the Second Division in 2012, while "A.C. Castellana Calcio" of Castel Goffredo plays in the Serie D championship.
- Table tennis: Tennistavolo Castel Goffredo plays in the A1 championship.

== See also ==
- Province of Mantua
- Mantua
- House of Gonzaga

== Bibliography ==
- Maria Pia Alberzoni; Annamaria Ambrosini; Alfredo Lucioni (eds.). Sulle tracce degli Umiliati. ISBN 88-343-0495-0.
- Giuseppe Amadei, Ercolano Marani (ed.). Signorie padane dei Gonzaga. [ISBN unspecified].
- Lombardia. Introduzione a una didattica dei territori. Vol. III Province di Bergamo Brescia Cremona Mantova. [ISBN unspecified].
- Museo Archeologico dell'Alto Mantovano - Cavriana. Guida. [ISBN unspecified].
- Una cultura alimentare di collina. Solferino oltre... ISBN 9788891779656.
- Gian Luigi Bassi (ed.). 18º Thermidor an. 4.me. Bataille de Castiglione. [ISBN unspecified].
- 24 giugno 1859: Solferino e San Martino. Le pietre raccontano la storia. [ISBN unspecified].
- Notizie storiche di Castelgoffredo (2 ed.). ISBN 88-7495-163-9.
- Diocesi di Mantova. [ISBN unspecified].
- Il territorio mantovano nel Sacro Romano Impero. Periodo comitale e periodo comunale. [ISBN unspecified].
- Emanuela Contessa; Matilde Monteverdi. I privilegi della chiesa di Asola. [ISBN unspecified].
- Raccolta di documenti per la Storia di Castelgoffredo e biografia di que' principi Gonzaga che l'hanno governato personalmente (1840). ISBN 88-88091-11-4.
- I dialetti italiani. Storia struttura uso. Lombardia. [ISBN unspecified].
- I Gonzaga di Castiglione delle Stiviere. Vicende pubbliche e private del casato di San Luigi. [ISBN unspecified].
- Le battaglie di Solferino e San Martino. [ISBN unspecified].
- Museo d'Arte Moderna dell'Alto Mantovano (ed.). Nene Nodari. [ISBN unspecified].
- La corte rurale nel Mantovano. [ISBN unspecified].
- Cinzia, Olimpia e Gridonia Gonzaga. Profilo storico del Collegio delle Vergini di Gesù di Castiglione delle Stiviere. [ISBN unspecified].
- Il Chiarismo. [ISBN unspecified].
- Piervittorio Rossi (ed.). Ab aestivis. Primo contributo di arte e cultura dell'alto mantovano. [ISBN unspecified].
- Piervittorio Rossi; Tullio De Mauro. Parole castiglionesi. Osservazioni lessicali sul dialetto di Castiglione delle Stiviere. [ISBN unspecified].
- Renata Salvarani (ed.). Pievi del Nord Italia. Cristianesimo, istituzioni, territorio. [ISBN unspecified].
- Chiesa e fascismo in una provincia rossa. Mantova 1919-1928. [ISBN unspecified].
- Con la lucerna accesa. Vita e assassinio del maestro mantovano Anselmo Cessi (1877-1926). [ISBN unspecified].
- La Provincia di Mantova oggi e nel passato. [ISBN unspecified].
- A. Turchini; G. Archetti; G. Donni (eds.). Visita apostolica e decreti di S. Carlo Borromeo alla diocesi di Brescia, in Brixia sacra, s. 3, XI, fasc. 3. Vol. II. Bassa centrale e orientale. pp. 197–414. [ISBN unspecified].
- Mario Vaini (1988). La spada e l'argento. I Gonzaga nel secolo XIV. Mantova: Arcari. pp. 91–102. In Carlo Marco Belfanti; Francesca Fantini D'Onofrio; Daniela Ferrari, eds. (1988). Guerre stati e città : Mantova e l'Italia padana dal secolo 13. al 19. atti delle Giornate di studio in omaggio ad Adele Bellù, Mantova 12-13 dicembre 1986. Arcari.
- Communitas Publicae. Vicende storiche di Piubega e del suo territorio. [ISBN unspecified].
- Quanta schiera di gagliardi. Uomini e cose del Risorgimento nell'alto mantovano (2 ed.). [ISBN unspecified].
