= Noble Virgins of Jesus =

Catholic society of apostolic life

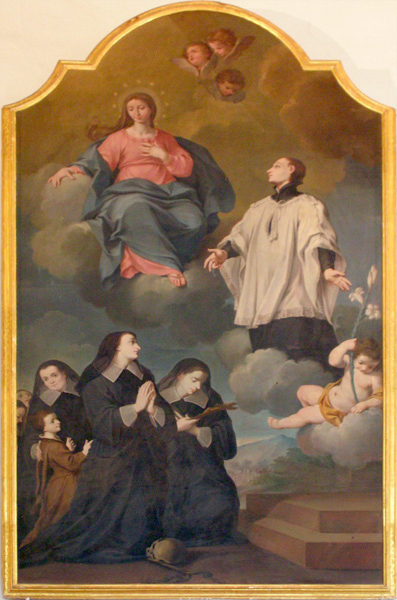
St. Aloysius Gonzaga intercedes for his nieces to the Virgin Mary

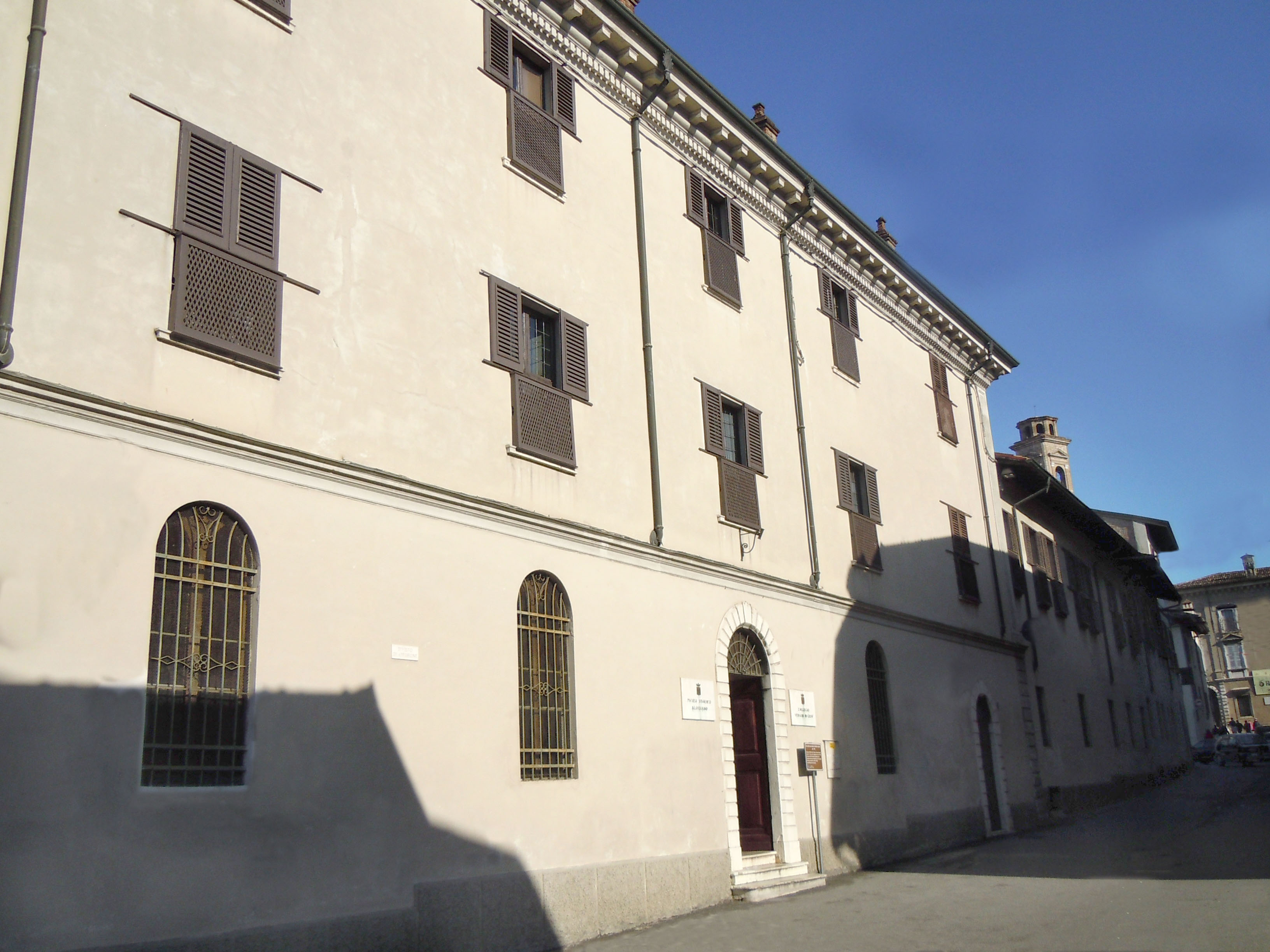
The Academy of the Virgins of Jesus in Castiglione delle Stiviere

The Society of the Noble Virgins of Jesus is a society of apostolic life of pontifical right founded in 1608. Its members are aristocratic women who dedicate themselves to a shared life in community and to female education.

== Description ==
The Society was founded by three sisters, Cinzia, Gridonia and Olimpia Gonzaga, They were the daughters of Elena Aliprandi and Aloysius' younger brother Rodolfo, thus the saint's nieces. Their father, Rodolfo, had been killed in 1593, when they were still infants, but the daughters wished to make reparations for his death in battle.

It developed out of an inspiration of Father Vergil Cepari, S.J. (1563–1631), who had been their father's confessor as well as having been a classmate of their sainted uncle. He had felt the need for the education of the young children of that city. The school for boys would be administered by the Jesuit Fathers, but there was no one to whom a school for girls could be entrusted. Thus Cepari envisioned a community of women who would dedicate themselves to this undertaking. The Gonzaga sisters took up the challenge, finding seven other young ladies of the city to join in this work. (Note: Their names were: Rodomilla Tissomburga, Anna Vangioni, Lelia Petrocini, Francesca Pastorio, Paola Carminati, Caterina Stagni and Anna Bellomi.) They established the Collegio delle Vergini di Gesù.

Their academy was opened on 21 June 1608—the feast day of St. Aloysius Gonzaga—in the Casa Aliprandi, their mother's family home. That same day, the first members of the Society held a ceremony in a local church during which each took a vow of chastity and swore perseverance to the work of the Society and obedience to the Mother Prelate (or Superior) of the community. They received formal civil standing from their uncle, the Marchese Francesco Gonzaga, on the following 27 September.

Their charter initially permitted only women of noble birth to join the society, with novices required to demonstrate their lineage. This rule was subsequently amended to permit the inclusion of commoners who were nominated by the Madre Prelata and then approved by the Council. After this expansion of membership, a division between members of noble and common origin was maintained. The former were called "Ladies" (Italian: Signore), and the latter, "oblates". The Ladies wore gowns of finer material those of the oblates and a black mantle rather than the white one of the oblates, by whom all housework was performed. The Ladies were the educators in their academy. A dowry was required for their admission to the community, while not for oblates.

In the past, the Society was notably distinct from an enclosed religious order in that its members were not nuns and thus not confined to a cloister. Rather, they were, with the consent of their Mother Superior, permitted to enter the outside world in pairs, and were also allowed to receive both male and female visitors. Unlike monastic communities, the community survived suppression during the Napoleonic era due to this status, and were able to continue their work. In 1891 the Collegio delle Vergini di Gesù hosted St. Pius X (then Bishop of Mantua) in honour of the festivities for the third centenary of St. Aloysius’ death.

In 1952 they were given pontifical recognition as a community by the Holy See. Their motherhouse and sole community remains in Castiglione delle Stiviere. The Historical Aloysian Museum opened on the premises in 1969. The society was never large, never numbering more than 30. As of 2012, there were 2 members left.
