= The Resurrected Christ =

Painting by Titian

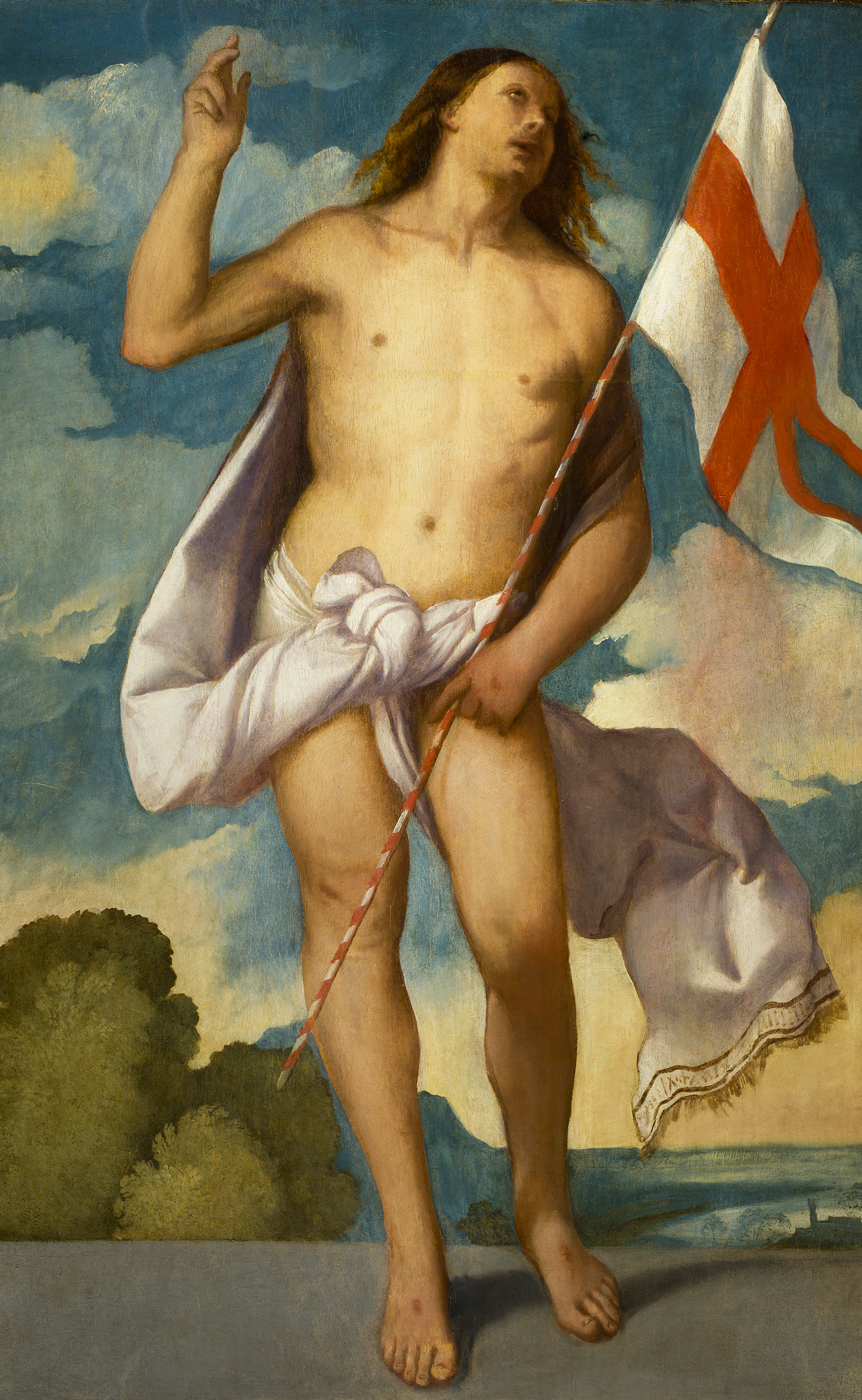
- Artist: Titian
- Year: 1511–1512
- Medium: Oil on panel
- Dimensions: 133.2 cm × 83.2 cm (52.4 in × 32.8 in)
- Location: Uffizi, Florence

The Resurrected Christ is a 1511–1512 oil on panel painting by Titian, now in the Uffizi in Florence with catalogue number 10093. It was acquired by that collection on 18 October 2001 and restored in 2001–2002.

A print of the work was made by Remoldus Eynhoudt and appears in David Teniers the Younger's 1660 Theatrum Pictorium, a collection of 243 engravings by various authors showing paintings then in Leopold William of Austria's collections, now mostly in the Kunsthistorisches Museum in Vienna. That work misattributes The Resurrected Christ to Palma il Vecchio and reverses the original painting's composition.

It is one of several works by the artist showing Christ just after his Resurrection, also including a 1542–1544 processional standard now in two parts with that subject on its reverse (Galleria Nazionale delle Marche) and Christ Appearing to his Mother after his Resurrection (parish church of the Assumption, Medole), the latter being his only altarpiece produced for the city and region of Mantua.

== Display history ==
- 2001, Acquisizioni e donazioni 1999 - 2000. Archeologia, Arte Orientale, Arte dal Medioevo al Novecento, Architettura, Rome.

== Gallery ==
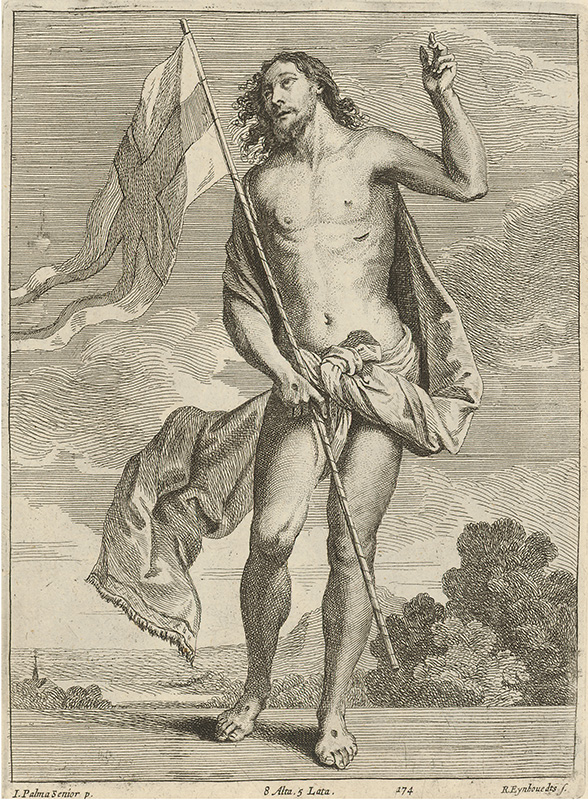
Remoldus Eynhoudt, The Resurrected Christ

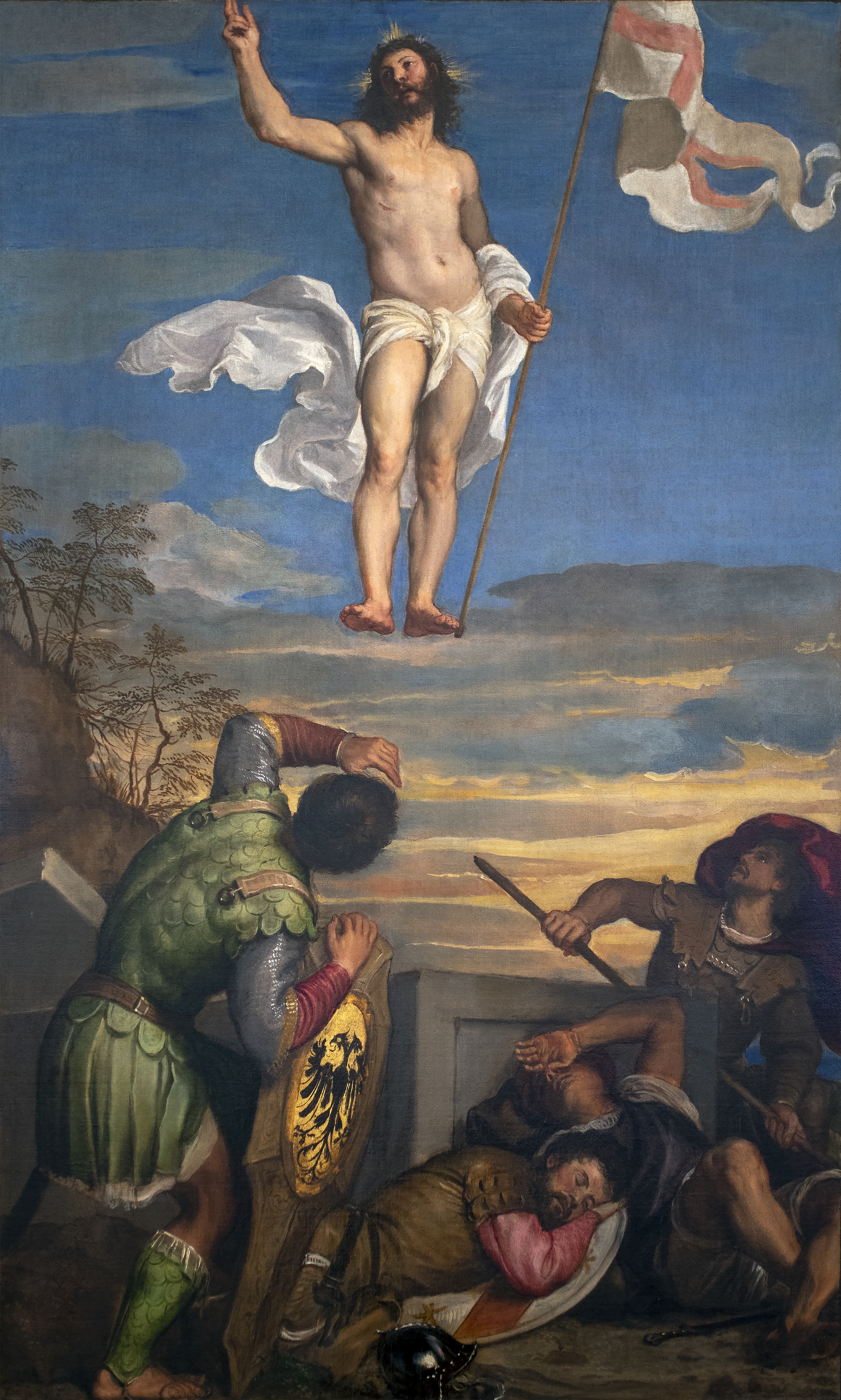
Titian, Resurrection, 1542–1544, Ducal Palace, Urbino

== See also ==
- List of works by Titian
