= Pesenti =

Pesenti is an Italian surname. Notable people with the surname include:

- Antonio Pesenti (cyclist) (1908–1968), Italian cyclist
- Antonio Pesenti (economist) (1910–1973), Italian economist and politician
- Baptiste Pesenti (born 1997), French rugby union player
- Domenico Pesenti (1843–1918), Italian painter
- Guglielmo Pesenti (1933–2002), Italian cyclist
- Massimiliano Pesenti (born 1987), Italian footballer
- Michele Pesenti (c. 1470–after 1524), Italian composer and lutenist
- Vindizio Nodari Pesenti (1879–1961), Italian painter and sculptor
- Pesenti family

== See also ==
- Alessandro Pesenti-Rossi (1942–2026), Italian racing driver
