= Manfredino di Alberto =

Italian painter

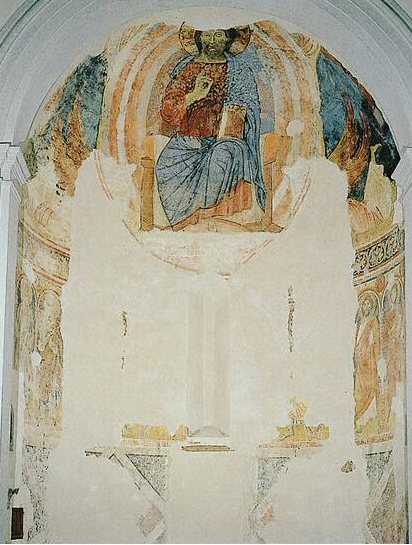
Ascension, Santa Maria a Ripalta, Pistoia

Manfredino di Alberto, also known as Manfredino d'Alberto or Manfredino da Pistoia, was an Italian painter active during the 13th century in Pistoia and Genoa.

He is said to have been born in Pistoia. In 1242, he painted frescoes, depicting Magdalen in the House of the Pharisee and St Michael Defeats the Devil for the apse of San Michele in Genoa. The church, suppressed in 1849, had the frescoes transported to the Academy of Fine Arts in Genoa.

Putatively in 1291, Manfrediano painted for a since-destroyed chapel in the Cathedral of Pistoia. He also painted Christ Pantocrator with Angels for the church of San Bartolomeo in Pantano, Pistoia and an Ascension for the church of Santa Maria a Ripalta in Pistoia.
