= Palazzo Panciatichi =

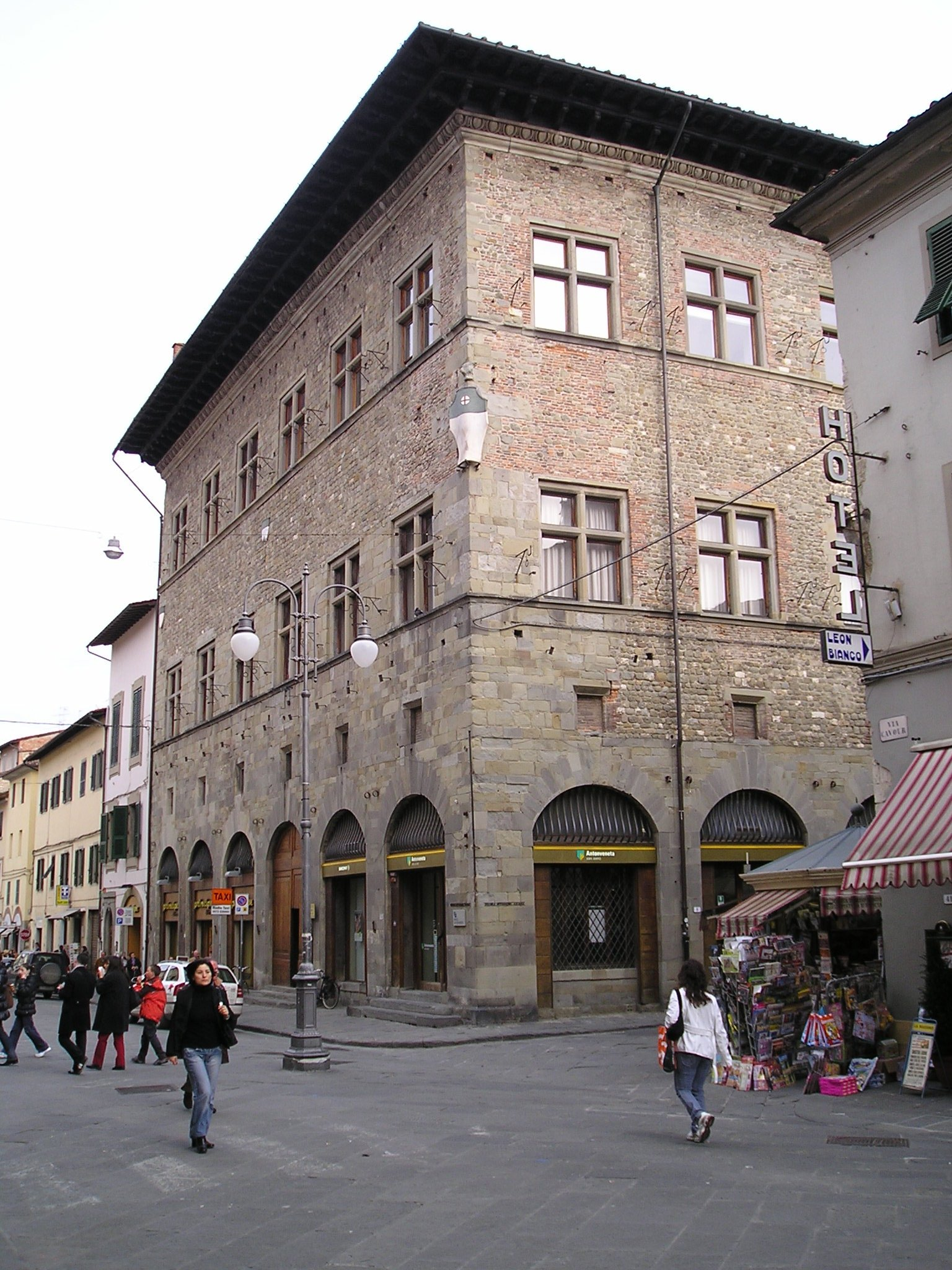
Palazzo Panciatichi

Palazzo Panciatichi or Palazzo del Balì is a medieval aristocratic palace located on Via Camillo Benso Cavour #35 (at the intersection with via Roma) in Pistoia, Tuscany, Italy. It a block away from the Palazzo Fioravanti.

== Description ==
It was begun in 1320 by Vinciguerra d'Astancollo Panciatichi, a rich Ghibelline (later Guelph) banker, as a fortified private residence. Vinciguerra had been exiled from the town by Cialdo de Cancellieri during 1278 to 1312, and during part of this interval, he served King Phillip the Fair as a mercenary general in Normandy. He returned in 1313-1314 to fight on the side of the Ghibelline Uggocione and was victorious in the Battle of Montecatini in 1315, allowing him to return to Pistoia.

The palace has a stone façade with three floors. The ground floor has wide arches, while lower with arches) ending with a large overhanging cornice. A few remaining original Guelph merlons along the roofline, can be seen on the eastern side. An uncommon feature of Italian contemporary architecture were the squared windows, which were more widespread in French Gothic architecture or in Aosta Valley at the time. The interior houses a portico with a garden, a large staircase leading to the first floor, which has a hall with wooden ceiling, and a loggia.

== History ==
This palace is notable for the inhabitants and visitors over the centuries. In 1057, it was occupied by Bellino di Pancio. Attanai returned to this house in 1187 from the second crusade and left for the third in 1219. In 1261, Astancollo, count of Lucciano became head of the Ghibelline faction in Pistoia; but five years later, after the defeat in the Battle of Benevento of the Ghibelline army led by King Manfred of Hohenstaufen, led to a mass expulsion of the fraction from Pistoia, including Vinciguerra. Martino Panciatichi lived here, he is known as the Ghibelline warrior who blocked the re-entry of Fillipo Tedici into Pistoia, slaying and decapitating Tedici at a bridge near San Marcello Piteglio. Putatively a sculpted head on display in the church of Sant'Andrea represents Tedici, who was despised by Pistoians for having betrayed and sold their city to the bellicose leader of Lucca, Castruccio Castracani. Also living in this house was Giovanni Panciatichi, who in 1329 mended the disputes between his family and that of the Cancellieri. Factions led by the latter family burned this palace a number of times during the 15th and 16th centuries.

In 1409, Corrado, the son of the above Giovanni, allowed for his palace to host Pope Alexander V, who had come to pray before the relics of St Atto. As subsequent owner, Andrea di Gualtieri, allowed Lorenzo il Magnifico, in 1478 to stay here while the plague raged in Florence. The Gualtieri family, loyal to the Medici, housed various members and supporters of that Florentine family at the house. In 1579, the house came into the property of the Cellesi family, who had received the title of "balì" of the Order of Saint Stephen.

Palazzo Panciatichi was damaged by an Allied aerial bombing in 1943 and remained abandoned until its restoration in 1965-1967. It currently houses the council of the province of Pistoia.

== Sources ==
- Rauty, Natale (1967). Il Palazzo Panciatichi o del Balì a Pistoia. Pistoia.
