= San Bartolomeo =

San Bartolomeo may refer to:

== Places in Italy ==
- San Bartolomeo al Mare
- San Bartolomeo in Galdo
- San Bartolomeo Val Cavargna

== Churches in Italy ==
- Santi Bartolomeo e Gaetano, Bologna
- San Bartolomeo in Pantano, Pistoia
- San Bartolomeo all'Isola, Rome
- San Bartolomeo, Venice
- Church of San Bartolomeo (Barberino Val d'Elsa), Barberino Val d'Elsa
