= San Giovanni in Corte Baptistery, Pistoia =

Church building in Pistoia, Italy

Coordinates: 43.933113°N 10.917088°E

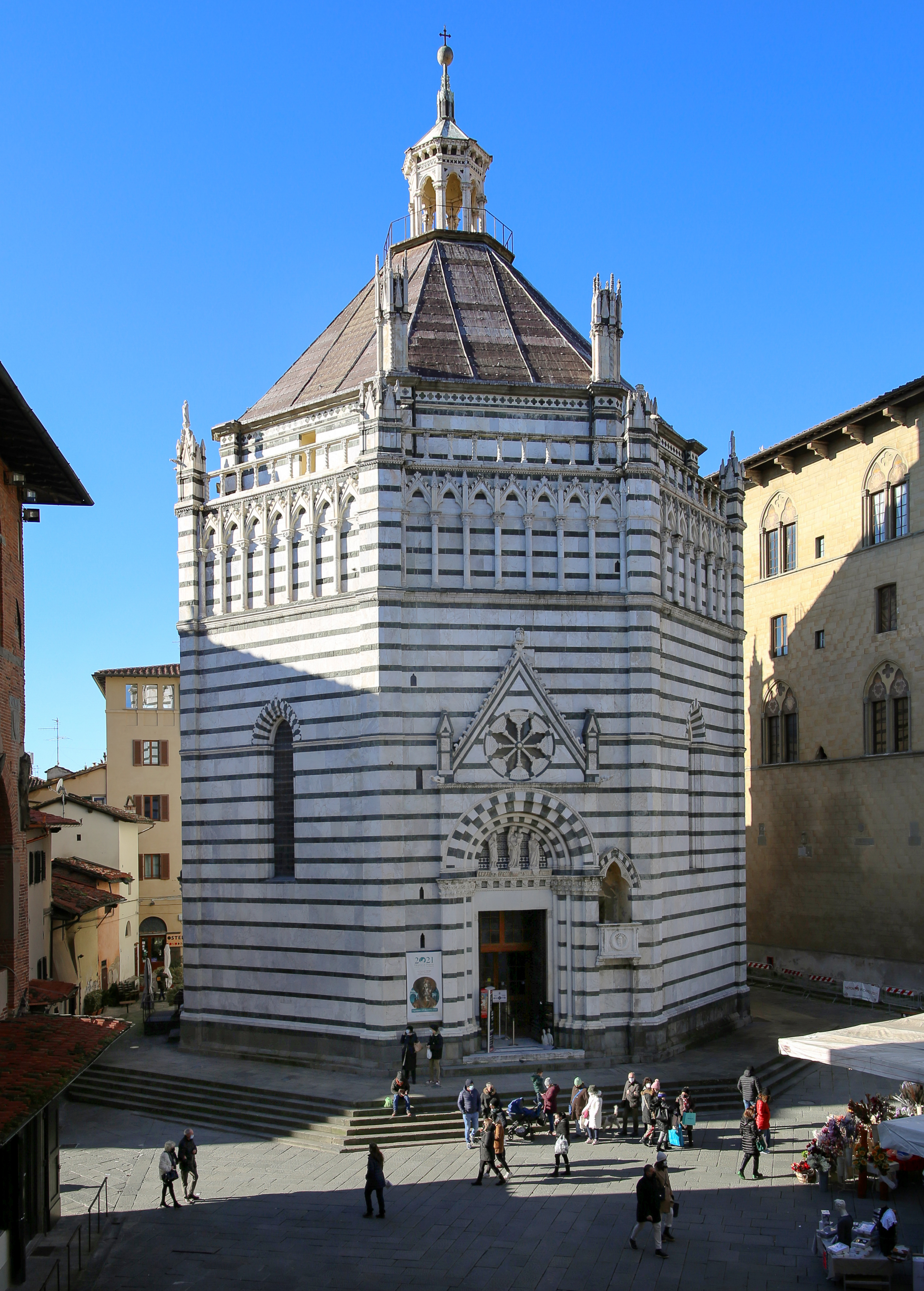
Baptistry of Pistoia

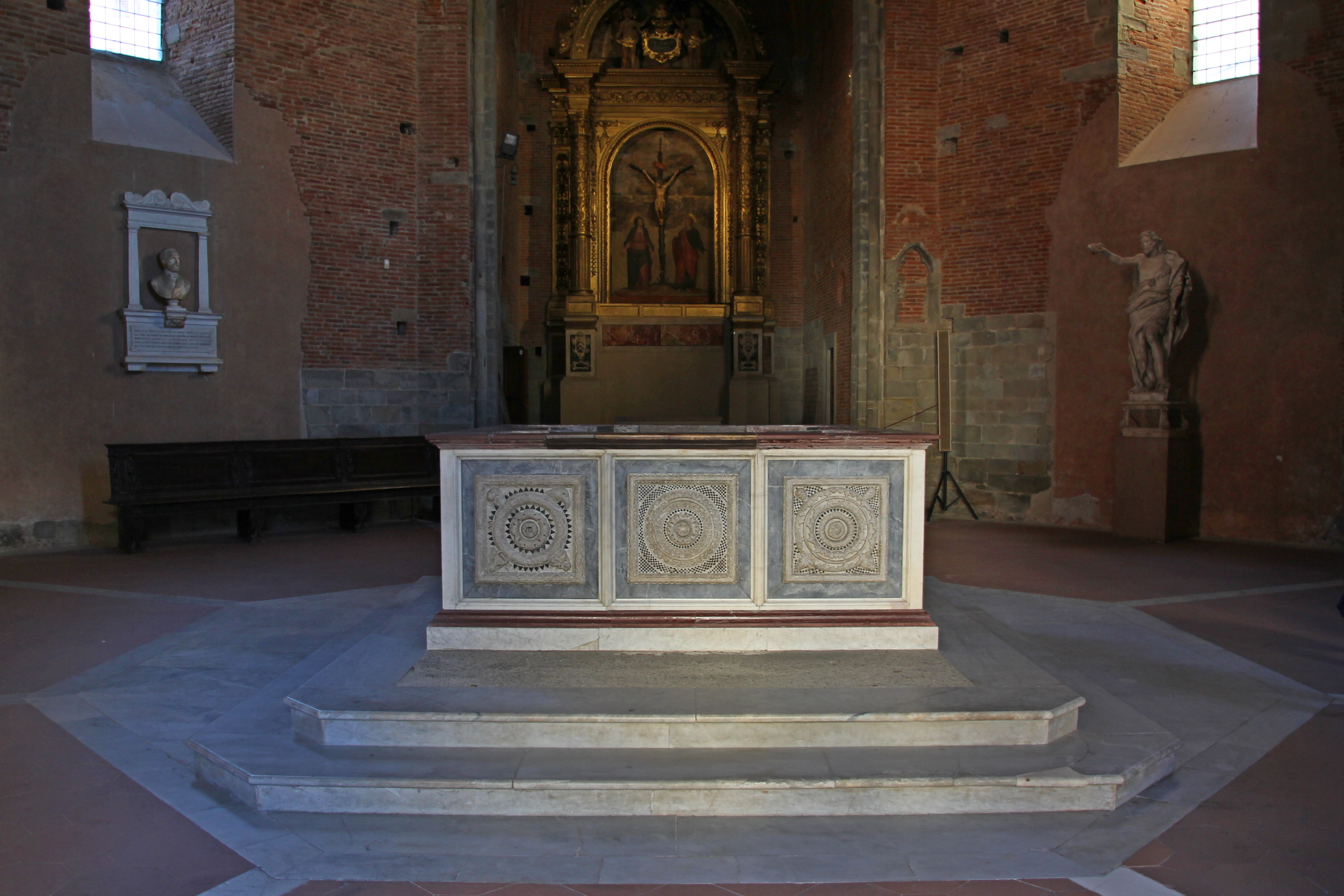
The interior seen from the entrance

The San Giovanni in Corte Baptistery (Italian: Battistero di Giovanni in Corte), also known as the Baptistery of San Giovanni di Rotondo, is the former Roman Catholic baptistery of Pistoia in Tuscany, Italy. The octagonal structure stands at a slight angle across a small piazza from the Duomo of Pistoia in the center of town. It is presently used for cultural events.

== Description ==
A likely centralized Lombard-era church of Santa Maria in Corte in front of the cathedral is mentioned in documents from 1114 and was likely on the site of the present structure. The decision to build this mainly Gothic-style building was made in 1303. The exterior sheath banded with marble of two colors was completed after over 30 years circa 1339 by Cellino di Nese.

The square baptismal font contains a large oval basin for the immersion of the full body in the ceremony, before baptizing shortly after birth became common. At both long sides shallow benches take the remaining space, while small circular basins occupy the corners. The surface is covered with red marble, echoed in the moulding at the base.

On each side of the font three decorative panels with elaborate floral reliefs protrude from intarsia of geometrical patterns in black and white, and framed by blueish stone. The floral panels were sculpted in 1226 by Lanfranco da Como (an uncle of Guido Bigarelli). The lunette above the portal displays three sculptures, the Virgin and Child between the patron saint John the Baptist and St Peter. The three figures stand upon protruding bases, which make up part of the architrave, dividing its width in five unequal parts. The slightly tilted panels in bas-relief show scenes of the baptist's life, in a style that resembles works of Giovanni d'Agostino.

Inside the baptistry a sculpture of St John the Baptist by Andrea Vacca is displayed on a pedestal. The idealistic statue of 1724, a conch with water in his outstretched hand, traditionally his gesture baptizing Jesus Christ

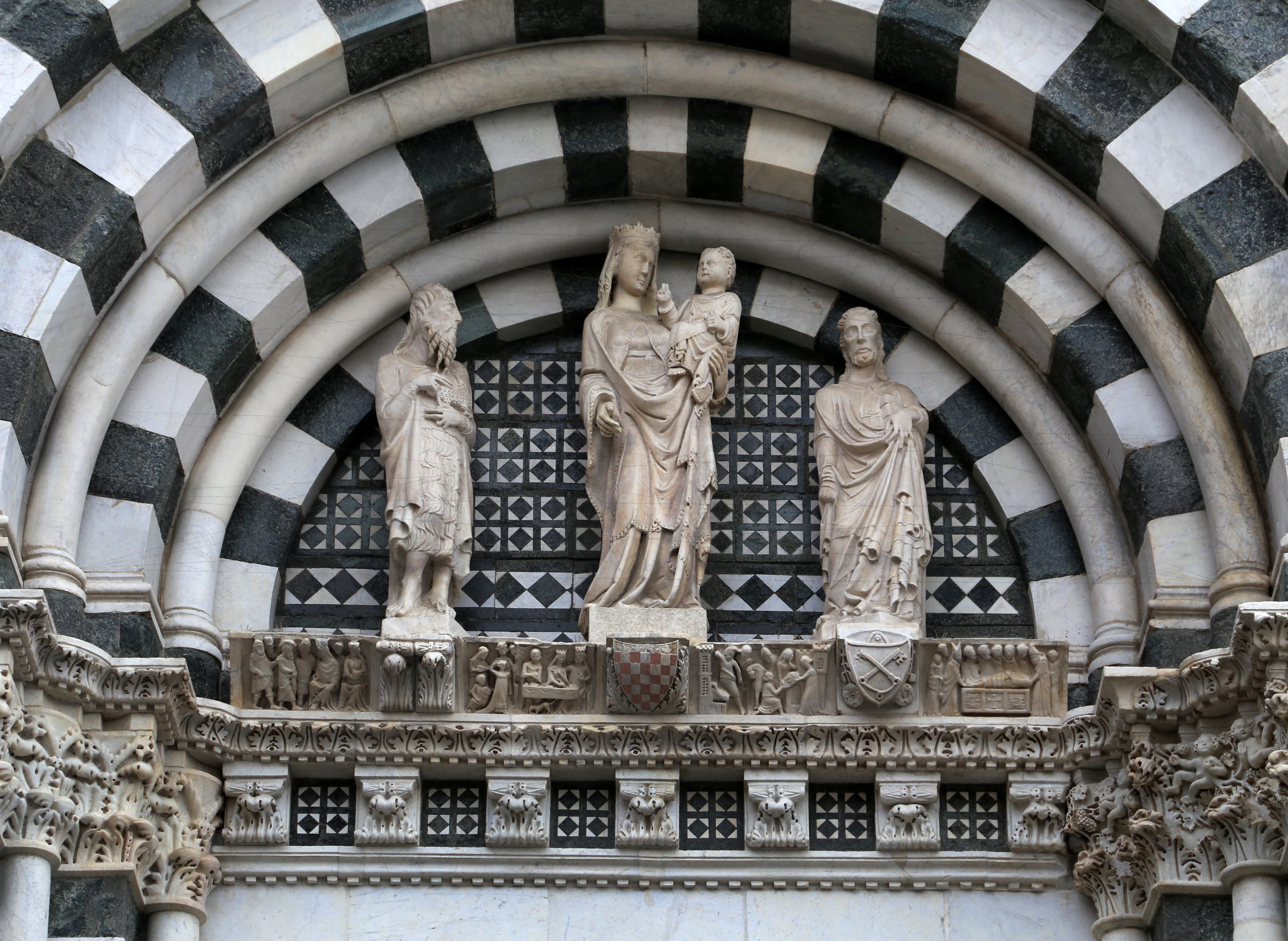
Portal sculptures of the Madonna and Saints John and Peter (attributed to Tommaso and Nino Pisano, mid-14th century)

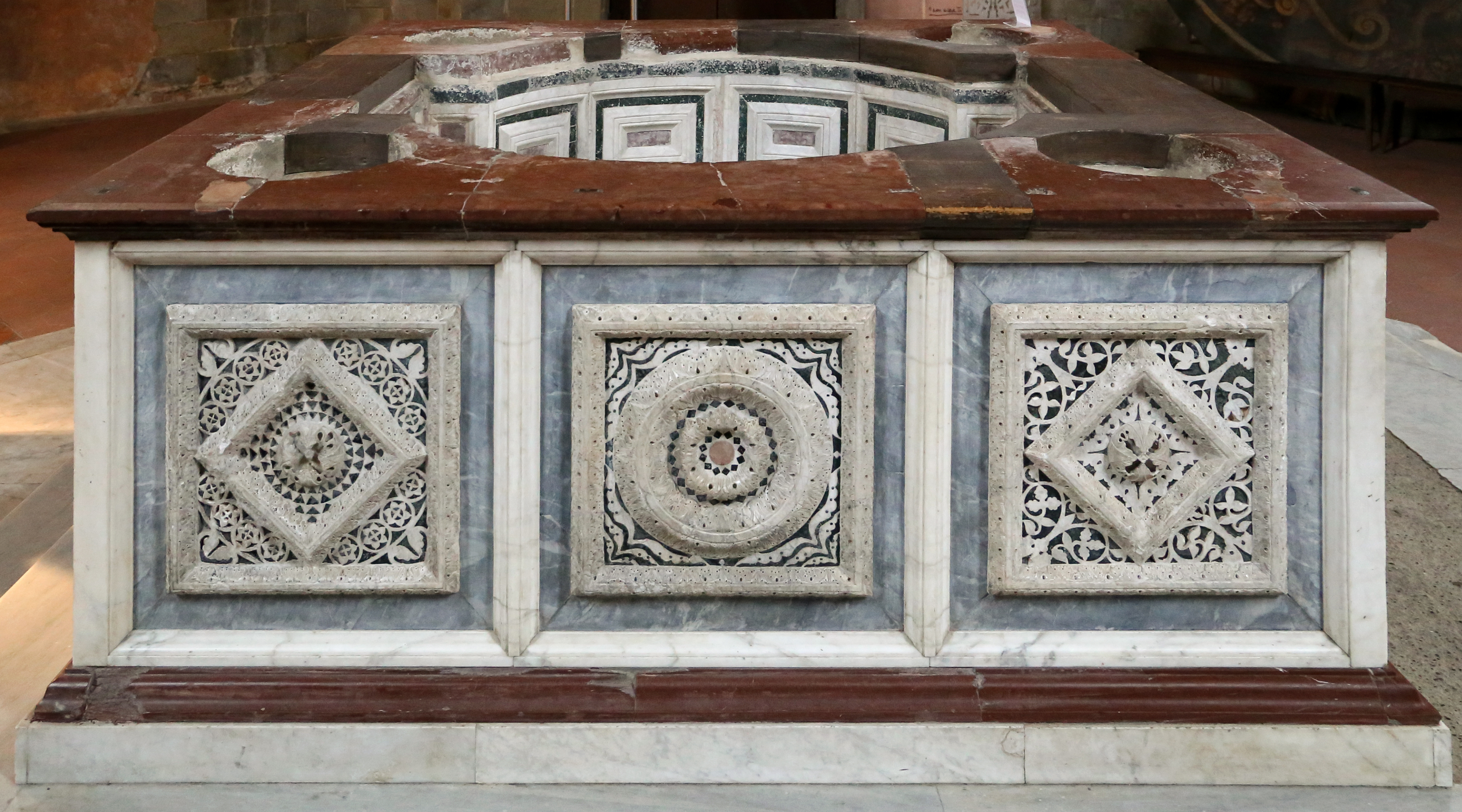
The baptismal font by Lanfranco da Como a. o. (1226)

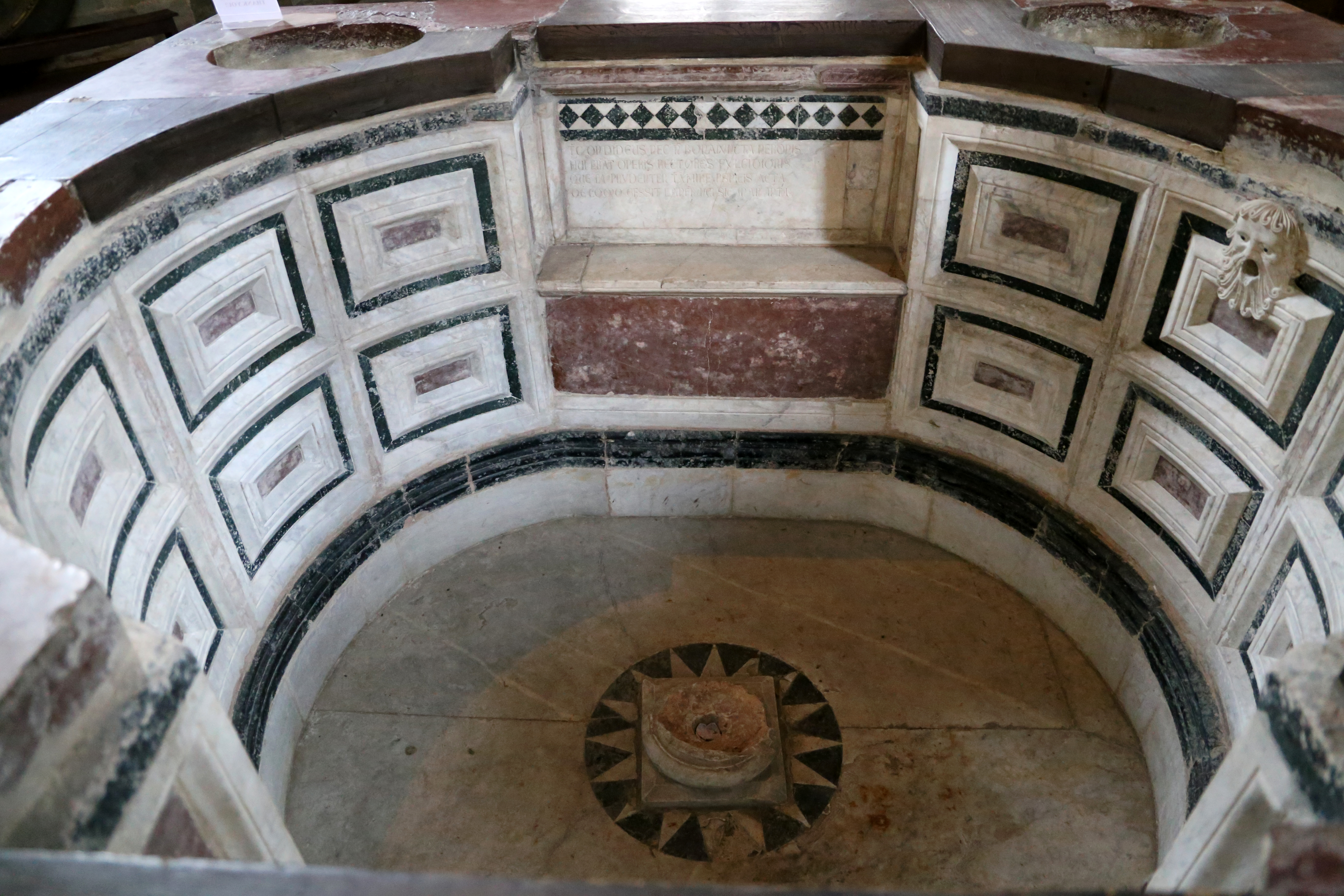
The oval basin of the baptistry font

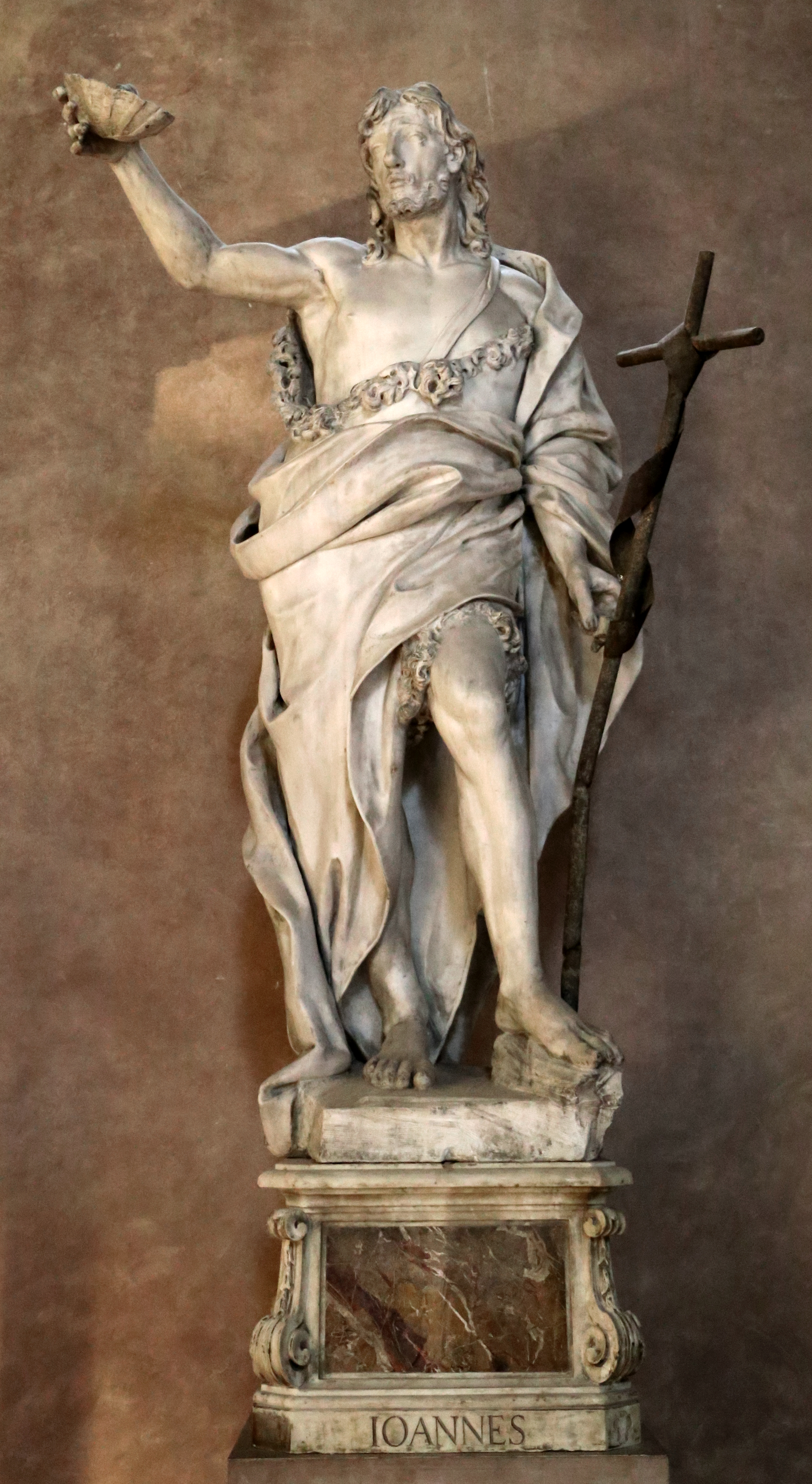
Marble sculpture of Saint Johnthe Baptist by Andrea Vacca (1724)

== See also ==
- Late medieval domes
