= San Pier Maggiore, Pistoia =

Former church in Tuscany, Italy

Coordinates: 43°55′57″N 10°55′14″E

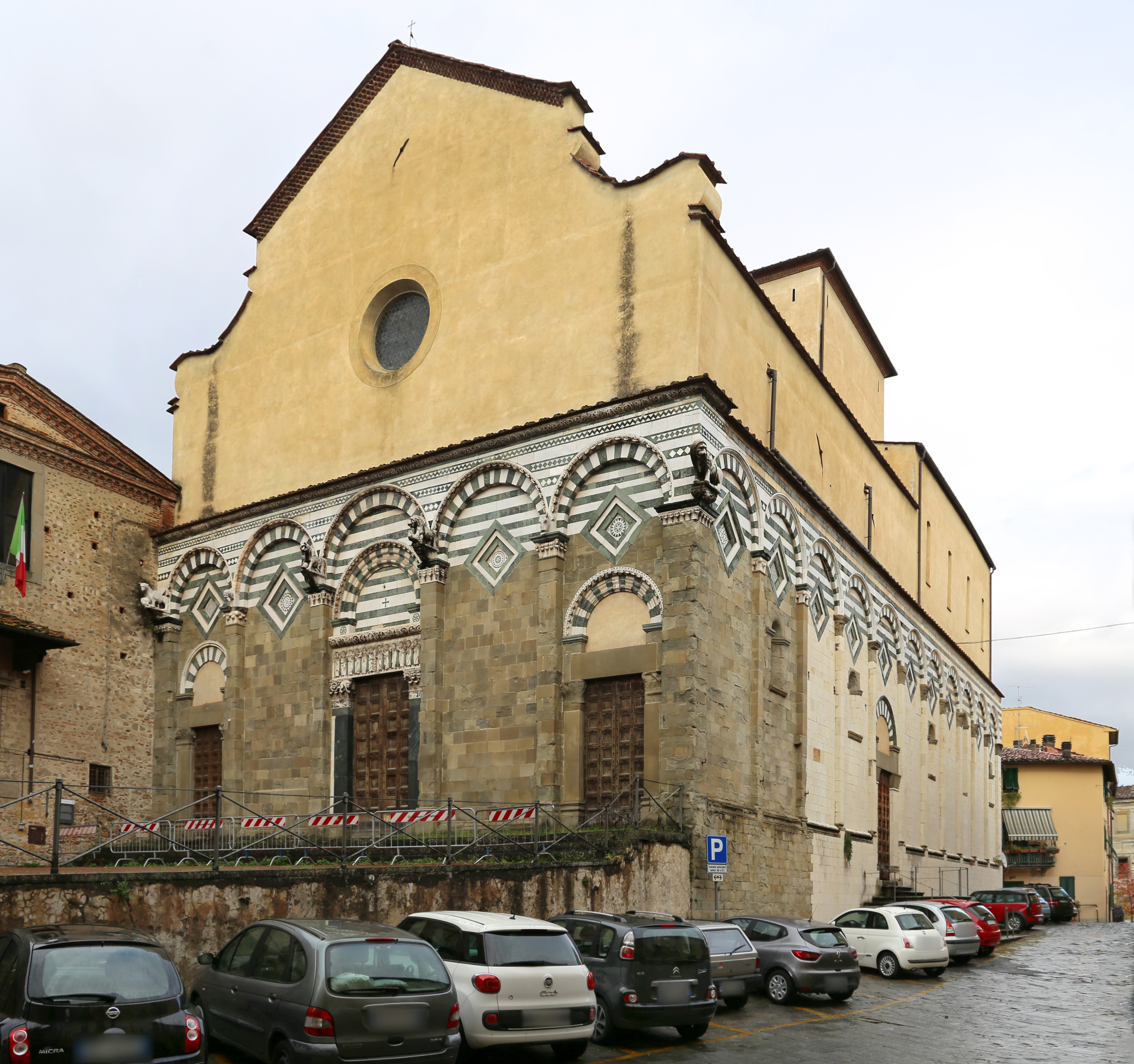
Exterior facade

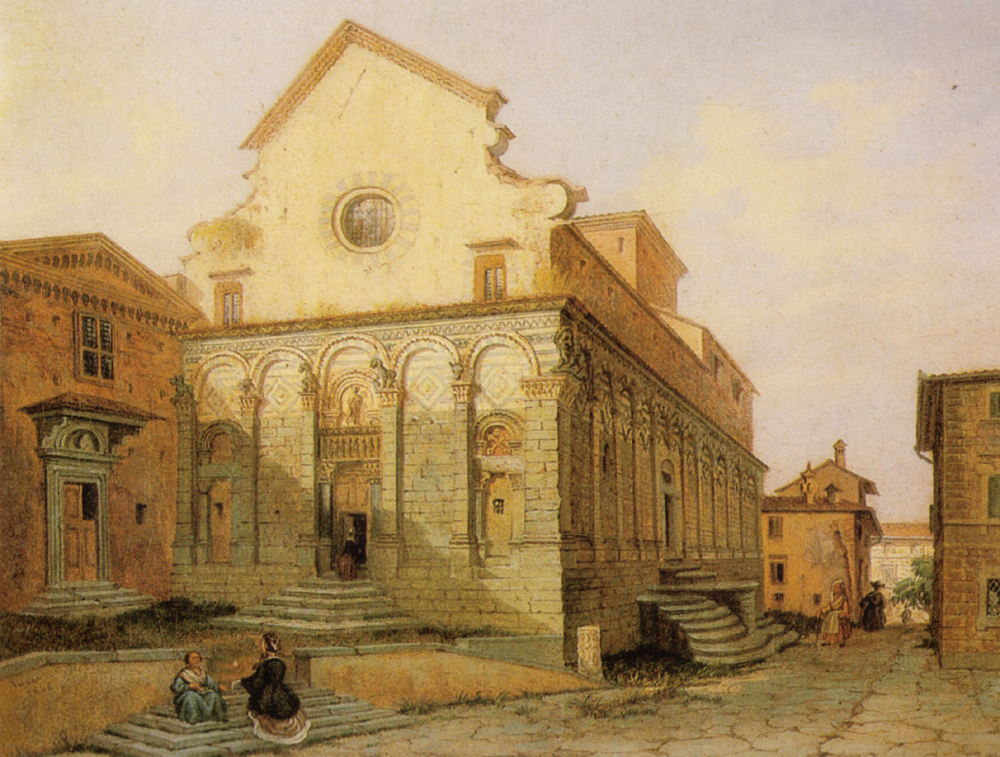
San Pier Maggiore in an 1865 canvas

San Pier Maggiore is an originally Romanesque-style, former Roman Catholic church in Pistoia, region of Tuscany, Italy. The church is notable for polychrome decorations that partially decorate the ground floor of the exterior, similar to that see in the church San Giovanni Fuorcivitas.

== History ==
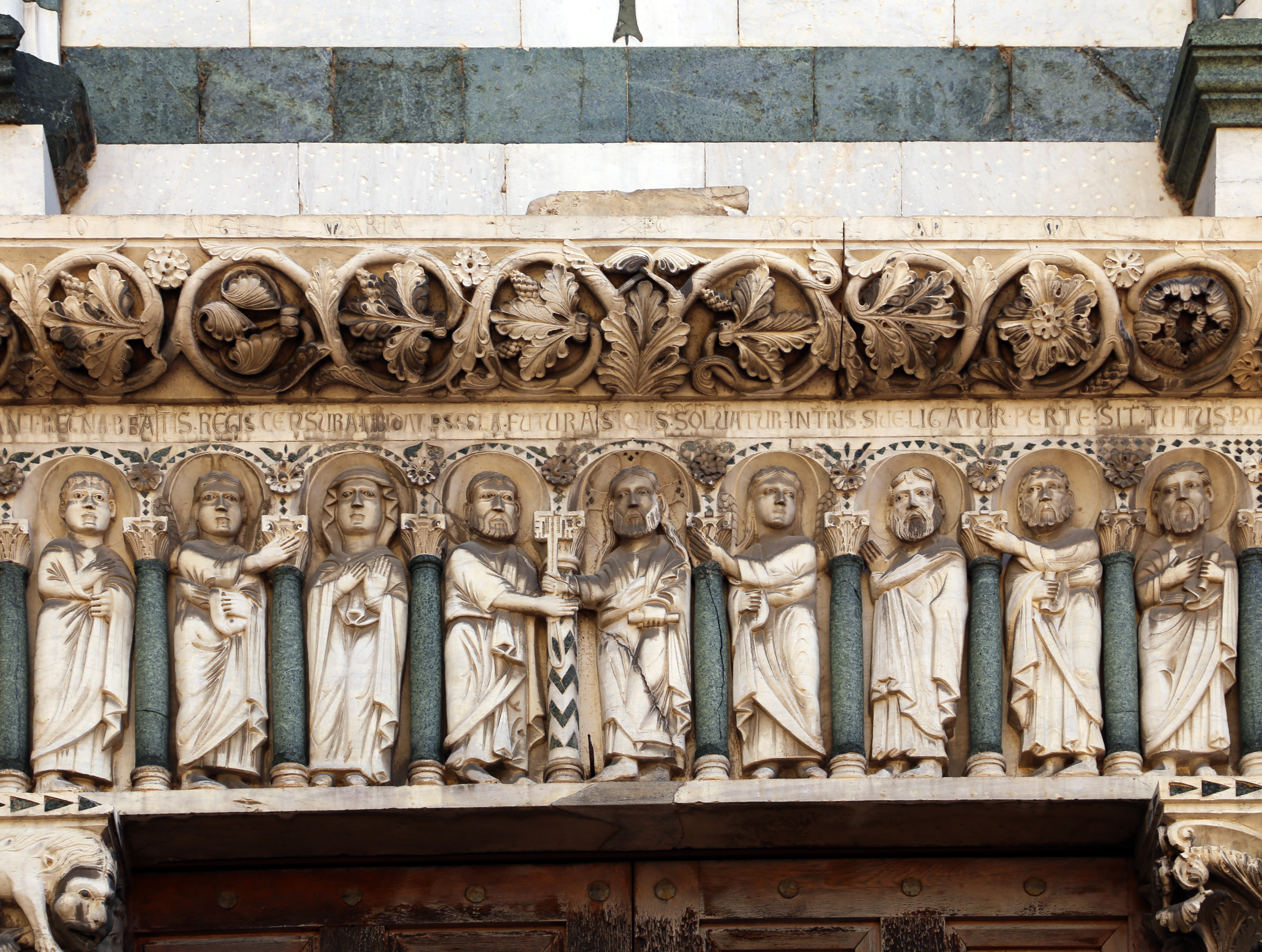
Jesus Giving the Keys to St Peter above entrance portal

A church here was putatively erected circa 798 by a Lombard patron, by the name of either Ratperto di Guinichisio or Retnato di Guillichisio. It came to be under the ownership of an order of Benedictine nuns, and later Franciscans. In underwent a few expansions and refurbishment, a major restoration in 1263, from when the Romanesque exterior derives. The central portal's architrave is attributed to the workshop of Guido da Como, and depicts a "Jesus Giving the Keys to St Peter, with the Virgin and the Apostles". The façade has maintained the original Romanesque appearance, and, like the nearby church of San Bartolomeo in Pantano, is divided into five compartments with bichrome decoration.

In 1640, under Jesuit ownership, the interior was largely restored and enriched with Baroque-style decorations. Today the church is deconsecrated, the interior artwork has been moved, and the former convent now houses a State Institute of Arts, the Liceo Artistico Petrocchi. In the matronaeum are exhibited work by the Pistoiese sculptor Andrea Lippi.

Of historical interest is that a newly appointed bishop to Pistoia, arriving to town via Porta Lucchese, in a ceremony in this church, would have a mystical marriage to the abbess of the Benedictine convent, and then move to the cathedral to take his post.
