= Ormanno Tedici =

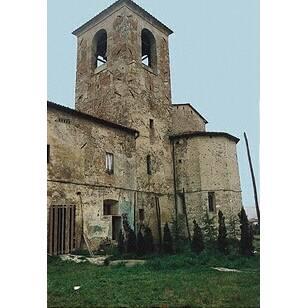
The abbey of Badia a Pacciana, where Ormanno was abbot

Ormanno Tedici was an abbot and Italian politician who served as the Lord of Pistoia between 1322 and 1324.

== Early life and education ==
Born in 1250 in Tuscany, Ormanno Tedici was the son of Messer Jacopo di Fortebraccio Tedici, who tried briefly to establish himself as lord of Pistoia. He was a relative of Agolante, who served as lord of Pistoia in 1237.

== Career ==
Ormanno entered the Benedictine-Vallombrosan order, becoming abbot of Badia a Pacciana. A wealthy and influential landowner, he was among the most prominent citizens of Pistoia in the second decade of the fourteenth century. In 1323, Ormanno was acclaimed April 1322, with the support of the local prominent Cancellieri and Taviani families, Ormanno was acclaimed Capitano (Captain) of the people of Pistoia.

From the 13th-century onward, the predominantly Guelph city of Florence began to exert influence and control over the predominantly Ghibelline city of Pistoia. This however led to worsening internecine conflicts between families, whose alliances were either Ghibelline or to one of the splintered groups of Guelphs, the Bianchi or the Neri. Under these circumstances of civil discord a successful condottieri from Lucca, Castruccio Castracani, came to power who ravaged rural communities belonging to Tuscany, thus isolating towns like Pistoia from the subjugation of Florence. Castracani's raids inflicted much hardship on Pistoia, escalating into a small war between the cities that lasted from 1302 to 1306. Given these circumstances, Ormanno, who had been abbot of the Monastery of Santa Maria di Pacciana, became the leader of a faction seeking a truce with Castracani. These accommodations with the Lucchese general were independent of Florentine wishes.

In 1305, the Castruccio Castracani degli Antelminelli, the Lord of Lucca, officially accepted Ormanno's truce. For this accomplishment, the Pistoians elevated Ormanno's title to Lord.

Prior to his ascent to power, Pistoia had undergone years of war and devastation. During his tenure, however, Pistoia thrived and remained at peace, thanks to Ormanno's skillful triangular diplomacy with the two major regional powers of the time, Florence and Lucca. Moreover, Ormanno's government was not despotic. A modest person, he continued to live in the monastery rather than setting up a residency in the town hall.

In 1324, however, Ormanno was deposed by his nephew, Filippo Tedici, often referred to as the Traditore di Pistoia or traitor of Pistoia, who sold the city to Castracani, in return for which he was paid 10,000 gold florins and given the hand of Castracani's daughter, Dialta. After being deposed, Ormanno retired to his abbey. He died the next year, perhaps as a result of poisoning. After the death of Castracani, scourge of Florence, in 1328, Filippo Tedici's fortunes also soured, and he was killed and decapitated.

== Legacy ==
Ormanno Tedici figures significantly in Machiavelli’s Life of Castruccio Castracani, in Mary Shelley’s novel Valperga, and in President John Adams’s Defence of the Constitutions of Government of the United States of America.

== See also ==
- Pistoia
