= Meo Abbracciavacca =

Italian poet

Meo Abbracciavacca (Italian pronunciation: [ˈmɛːo abˌbrattʃaˈvakka]) was an Italian poet from Pistoia who died in 1313. Dante Gabriel Rossetti translated two of Abbracciavacca's poems into English in his work titled The Early Italian Poets From Ciullo D'Alcamo to Dante Alighieri (1100-1200-1300): Canzone. He will be silent and watchful in his Love (translation of original Italian verse starting "Madonna, vostra altera canoscenza") and Ballatta. His Life is by Contraries (translation of verse starting "Per lunga dimoranza").

== Selected extracts ==
Madonna, vostra altera canoscenza,
E l'onorato bene,
Che 'n voi convene tutto in piacimento,
Mise in voi servir sì la mia intenza,
Che cura mai non tene,
Nè pur sovvene d'altro pensamento,
E lo talento di ciò m'è lumera.
Così piacer mi trasse in voi, compita,
D'ogni valor gradita,
Di beltate e di gioia miradore,
Dove tuttore prendendo mainera
L'altre valente donne di lor vita;
Perciò non ho partita
Voglia da intenza di star servidore.

(first stanza as printed on page 5 of Poeti del primo secolo della lingua italianna in due volumi raccolti by Lodovico Valeriani and Urbano Lampredi, 1816)
