= Domenico Pesenti =

Italian painter (1843–1918)

Domenico Pesenti (Medole, 1843 – Mantua, 1918) was an Italian painter and antiquarian. He painted mainly vedute.

== Biography ==
The family first had him study at the Moretto School in Brescia, from where he moved in 1862 to the Brera Academy in Milan. At the Brera, he studied under Camillo Boito, Giovanni Bertacchi, and Carlo Ferrario. In 1864 he exhibited at the Milanese Mostra the watercolor View of the Church of San Celso and neighbor sanctuary of Santa Maria With the help of the painter Ferrario, for whom he was an assistant, and of Eleuterio Pagliano, he moved to Milan in 1870. In Milan, he was also patronized by G. Mylius, and painted interior and external vedute: Bedroom in the Royal Palace of Milan, (1869, Pinacoteca Brera), Gate of the hall of the college in the Ducal Palace in Venice (exhibited in 1877 at Milan).

In 1877 he settled for twenty years in Florence, where he opened the studio near the Arno and often sold through the Pisani Gallery. To the 1872 Exhibition of Milan, he sent the following works: Vedute of the city of Siena from the Fortezza di Santa Barbara; Interior of the plebeian baptismal church of Siena. In 1877 at Naples, he exhibited: Chapel of the Madonna delle Grazie in the Palazzo Venezia in Rome; Camera da letto in the palazzo di corte a Milan; at Venice, in 1881, he exhibited: Vendita di Augurie. To the 1882 and 1883 Promotrici exhibitions, he sent: La Vedetta; Suonatori ambulanti; Una partita a briscola. In 1883, at the Mostra of Rome, he displayed: Cattiro tempo; Anorant anni; Effetto di Sole. In 1884, at Turin, he displayed: Music Teacher; at the 1884 Promotrice he displayed, a plate painted in oil titled Frate; Primizie; Il piccolo artista; The Factory of Stoviglie of the signor Grassini of Montelupo; The factory of Stoviglie of signor Romagnoli also of Montelupo; Portrait of the signora contessa Mattei in her salon; finally at the Promotrici del 1885-89, Fabbrica di Stoviglie del signor Grassini già stato esposto; Visita ai contadini di Valebbraia; In Toscana; Madonna di Andrea del Sarto at the church of the Santissima Annunziata of Florence; Studio di Frate Savonarola in the Museo di San Marco in Florence; Choir of the church of Santa Maria Novella; Entrance to the Medici Chapels; and Cloister di Santa Maria Novella di Florence. At the Promotrice of Florence, he painted a water color view depicting the Royal Plaza of Munich. In 1897, he moved to Mantua where he painted many portraits and landscapes.
