= Palazzo Fioravanti, Pistoia =

15th-century palace in Pistoia, Tuscany, Italy

The Palazzo Fioravanti, formerly Palazzo Gherardi-Peraccini is a 15th-century early-Renaissance style palace located at Via Benso Cavour #20 in central Pistoia, Tuscany, Italy. It stands across the street from the north flank of the church of San Giovanni Fuorcivitas.

== Description ==
The palace originally belonged to the Fioravanti family, and among the heraldic symbols in square frames on the facade, is the one belonging to this family, and identifying them as Guelph Gonfalonieri of the medieval Florentine republic. Jacopo Fioravanti of this family was a historian of Florence. In 1722, it was acquired by the Gherardi family, and in the 19th century the Peraccini family. It is now private apartments and retail establishments.

The layout has affinities with the late 14th-century Palazzo Davanzati, with the ground floor having three ground story portals with rounded archways. The top floor on one side has a loggia supported by pilasters. The upper stories suggest the palace was built by combining two adjacent properties, since the windows from the upper floors differ with mullioned window on the right, and the joint sit is evident.
