= Vindizio Nodari Pesenti =

Italian painter

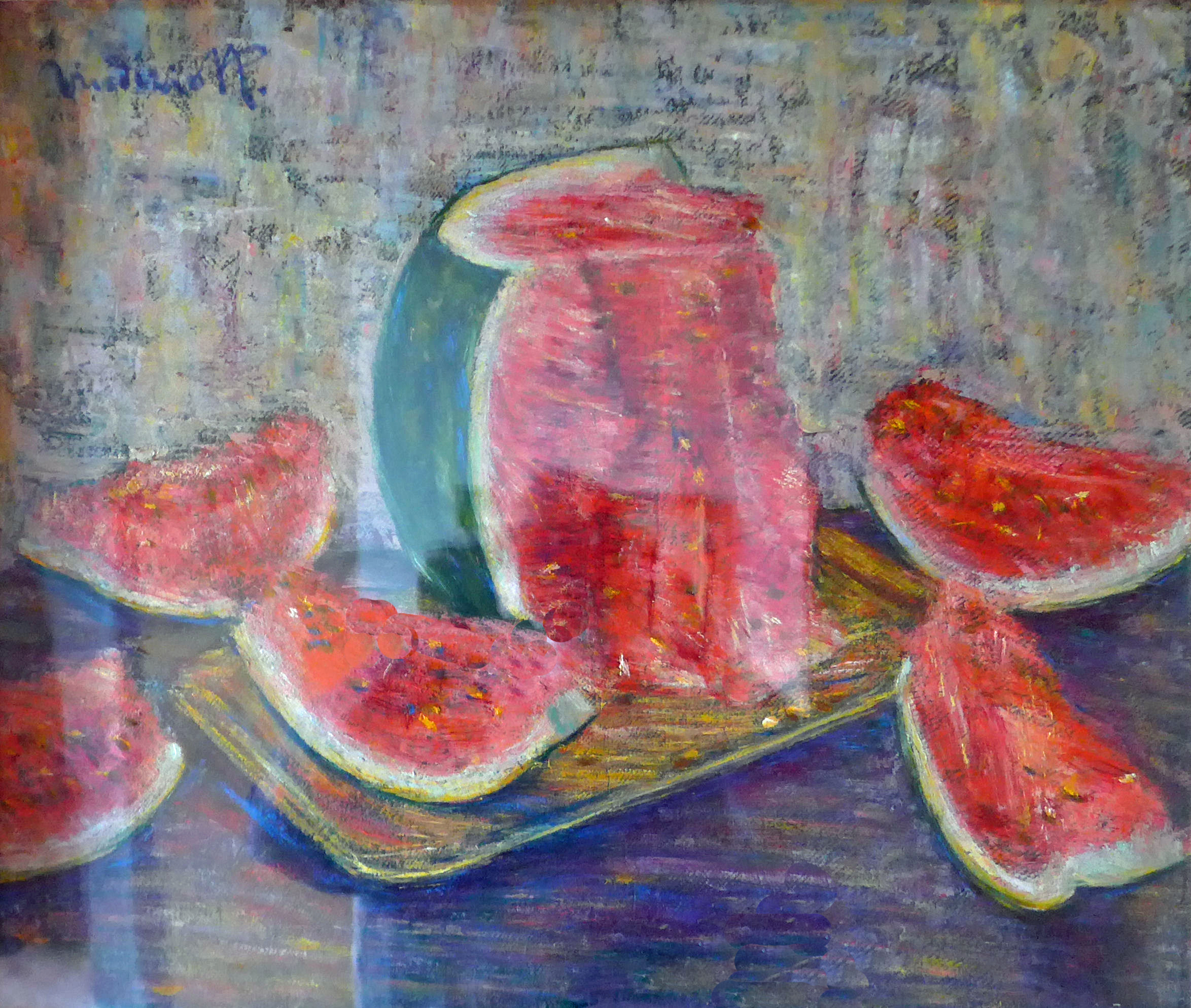
Watermelon by Pesenti

Vindizio Nodari Pesenti (1879–1961) was an Italian painter.

He was born in Medole, in the province of Mantua. He first trained under his uncle the painter Domenico Pesenti, but then traveled to Paris, Venice, and Milan to further his studies. He became friends with the Futurist artists Umberto Boccioni and Carlo Carrà. He painted both external landscapes. The Fondazione Banca Agricola Mantovana has two of his paintings. He also painted interior scenes. He died in Mantua.
