= Santa Barbara Fortress, Pistoia =

14th-century castle in Pistoia, Tuscany, Italy

Coordinates: 43°55′45″N 10°55′21″E

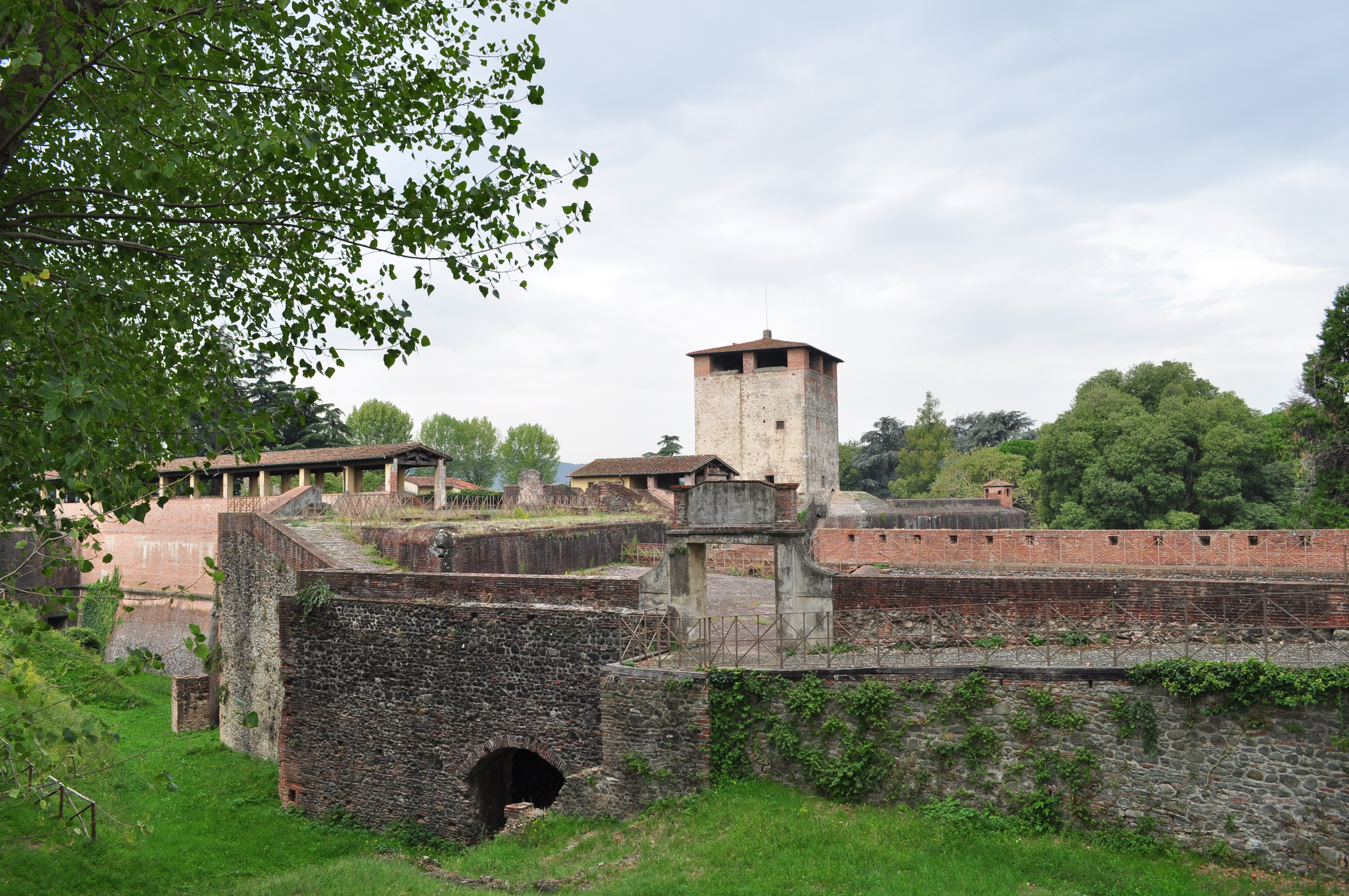
Distal view of Fortress

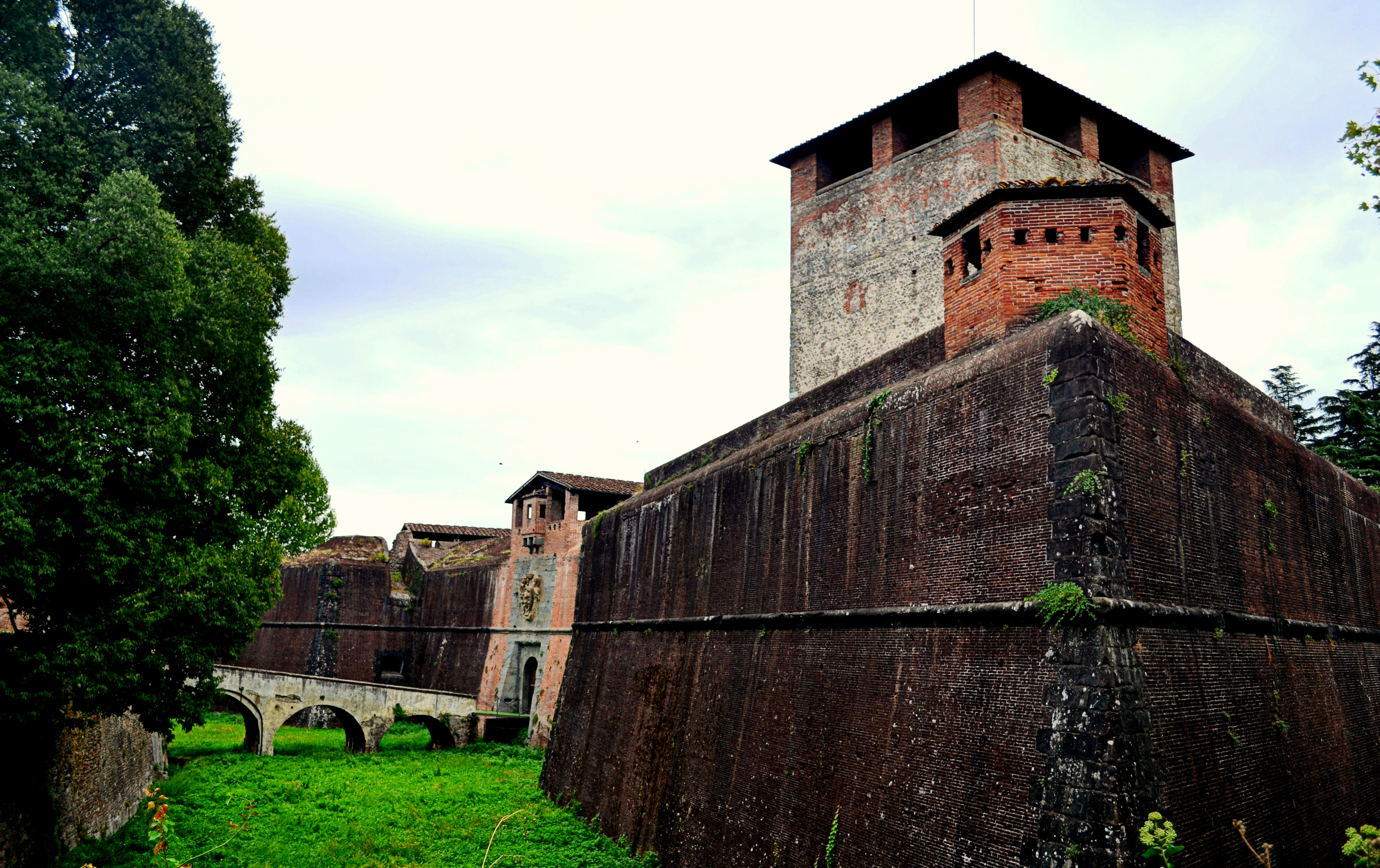
Moat, walls, and view of entrance portal

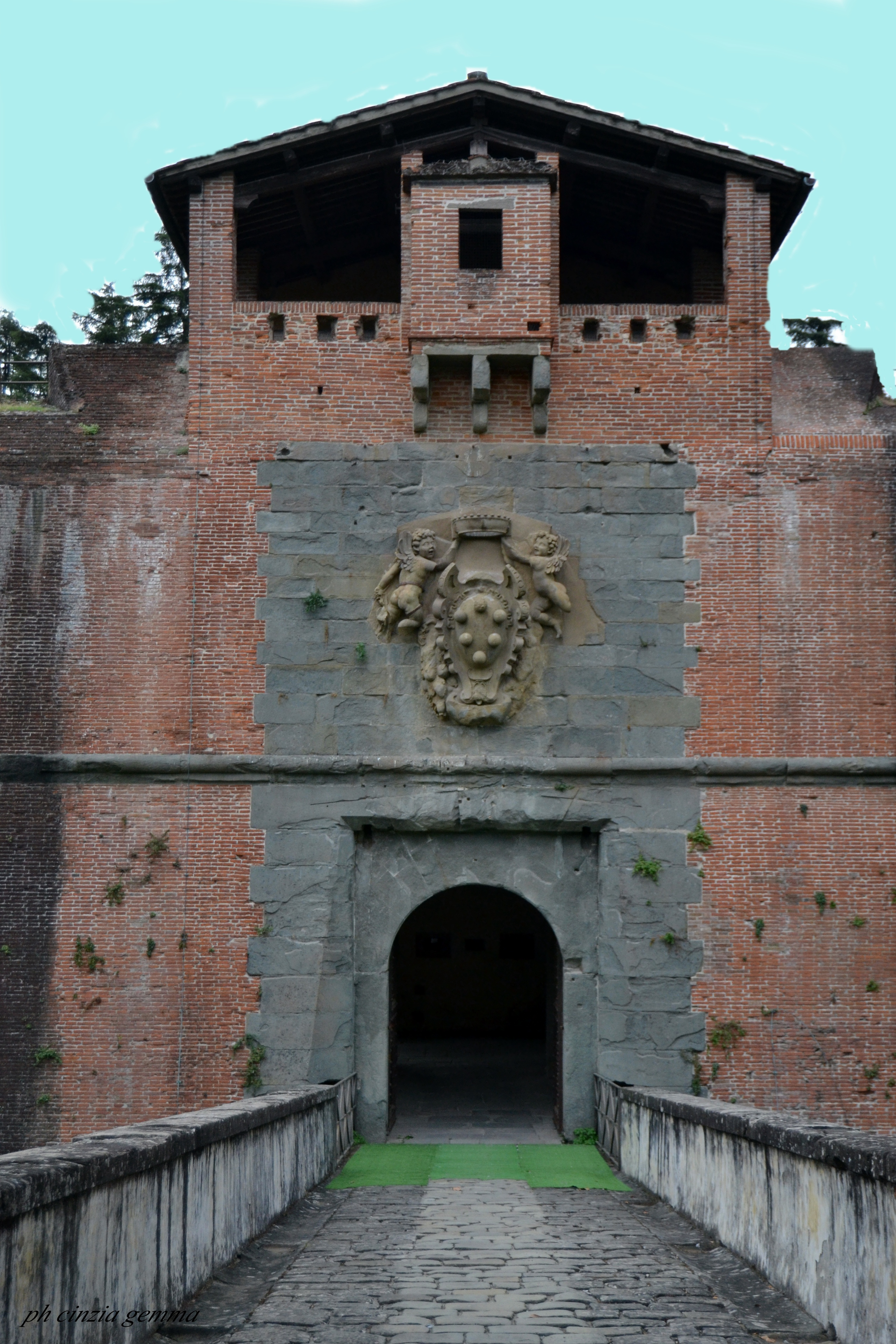
Entrance portal with Medici coat of arms

The Fortress of Santa Barbara (Fortezza di Santa Barbara) is a 14th-century urban castle erected to house troops guarding the town of Pistoia, in the region of Tuscany, Italy. While it is suggested that initially the fortress was named after a nearby church of Saint Barnabas, however, Saint Barbara is the patron saint of artillerymen.

The initial fortress was erected in 1331, after the Florentine Republic had defeated the forces of Castruccio Castracani, and reconsolidated their power over Pistoia. In 1531, under the designs of Nanni Unghero, the fortress was enlarged, but subsequently during the rule of the Grand Duke Cosimo I de' Medici the fortress was further enhanced, initially by Giovanni Battista Belluci, and subsequently by construction of a perimeter wall under the design of Bernardo Buontalenti. Similar fortress buildings by the Medici ruler took place throughout Tuscany, including the similarly named Fortezza di Santa Barbara in Siena in 1561–63. Unghero's fortress had been a simple moated quadrilateral, but Buontalenti linked the structure to the city wall. The fortress was only besieged in 1643, when the armies of the Pope Urban VIII Barberini unsuccessfully attacked the city.

In the late 18th-century, Grand Duke Pietro Leopoldo I, relieved the fortress of its role in the city defences, changing the main functions to work as barracks. In subsequent decades it also served as a jail. In 1970, much-needed restoration work was begun. The fortress chapel has some Baroque era frescoes. Presently surrounding land serves as parkland and the ramparts have views of town and surrounding territory.
