= Santa Maria in Ripalta, Pistoia =

Former church in Tuscany, Italy

Coordinates: 43°56′11.7″N 10°54′49.2″E

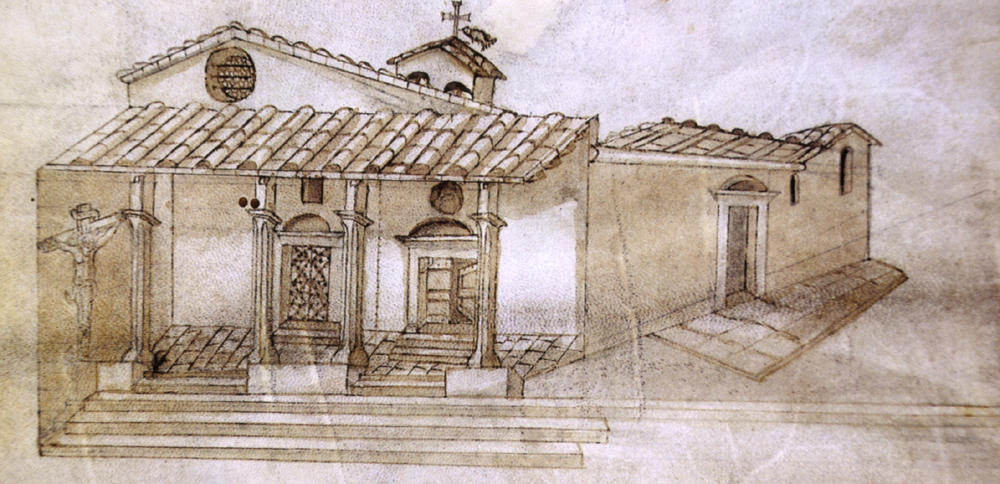
Church of santa maria a ripalta di pistoia, drawing of 1582

Santa Maria in Ripalta is a Renaissance-style, former church located in Via San Giuliano in Pistoia, region of Tuscany, Italy. The structure is under restoration.

== History ==
The church derived its name from a gate in the city walls through which Uguccione della Faggiola tried to overcome Pistoia during a siege. It had been previously dedicated to San Giusto. The church once had a venerated processional crucifix carried in town in 1399 during the Bianchi processions, a popular religious revival. It was then moved to Sant'Andrea. In 1554, the adjacent Canon's residence housed monks that had fled from Montecatini Terme to escape capture by Piero Strozzi. In the 19th century, it was assigned to the Confraternita del Suffragio. In the 20th-century, it became property of the commune.

A Romanesque-era fresco depicting Christ Pantocrator has been uncovered during restoration. An inventory in 1853 listed the following artworks:

- Enthroned Virgin with Various Saints, main altarpiece by Scalabrino (Giovanni Battista di Pietro di Stefano Volponi?)
- St Francis of Paola, left altar, by unknown author.
- Christ contemplates a cross, right altar, by unknown author.
