= Pistoia =

- Comune
- Città di Pistoia
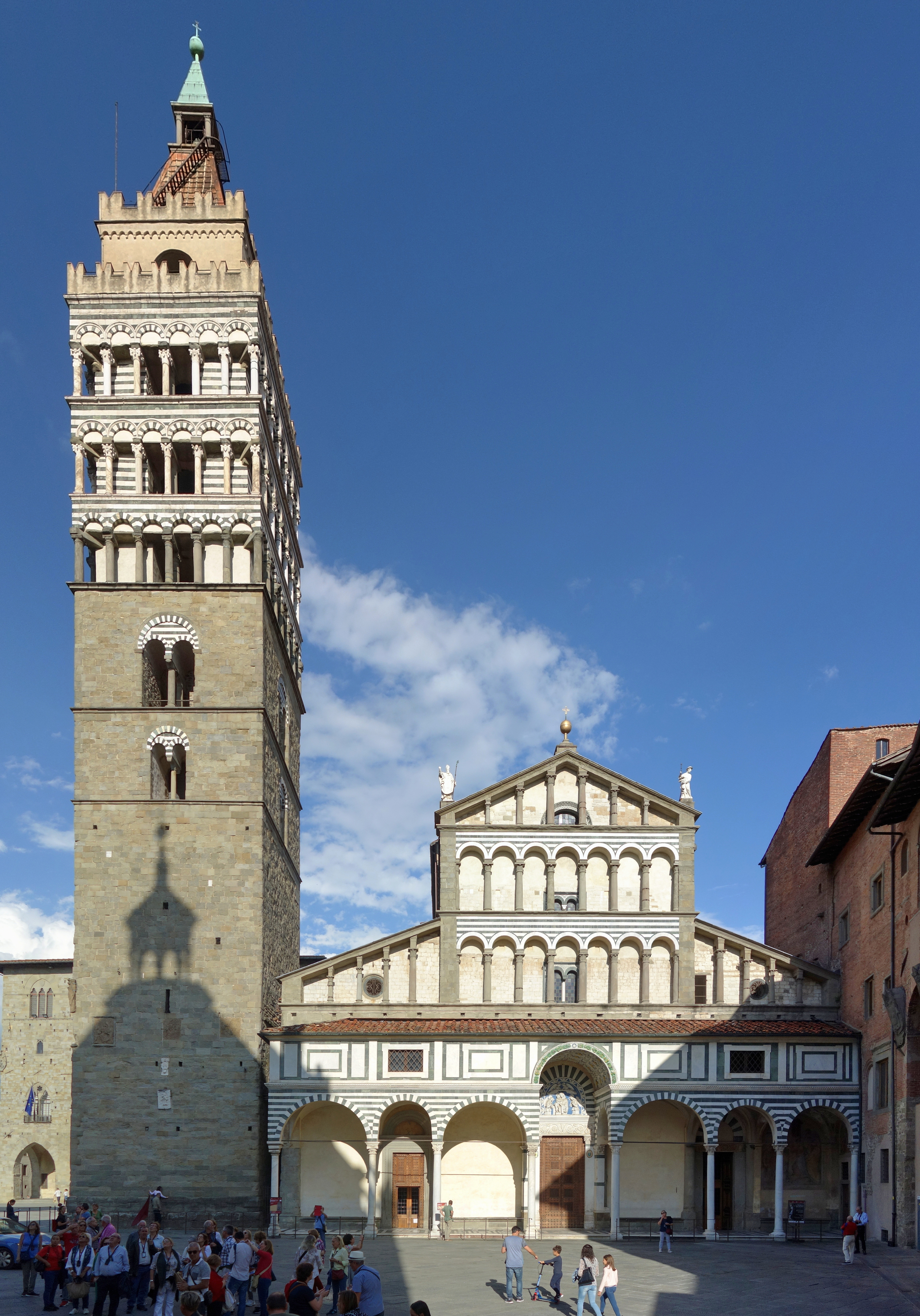
- Pistoia Cathedral with bell tower

- Flag Coat of arms

- Pistoia within the Province of Pistoia

- Location within Italy Location within Tuscany
- Coordinates: 43°56′N 10°55′E
- Country: Italy
- Region: Tuscany
- Province: Pistoia (PT)
- Frazioni: see list

Government
  - Mayor: Giovanni Capecchi (PD)

Area
  - Total: 236.17 km^{2} (91.19 sq mi)
- Elevation: 65 m (213 ft)

Population (31 October 2025)
  - Total: 89,090
  - Density: 377.2/km^{2} (977.0/sq mi)
- Demonym(s): Pistoiese (singular), Pistoiesi (plural)
- Time zone: UTC+1 (CET)
  - Summer (DST): UTC+2 (CEST)
- Postal code: 51100
- Dialing code: 0573
- Patron saint: St. Jacopo
- Saint day: July 25
- Website: Official website

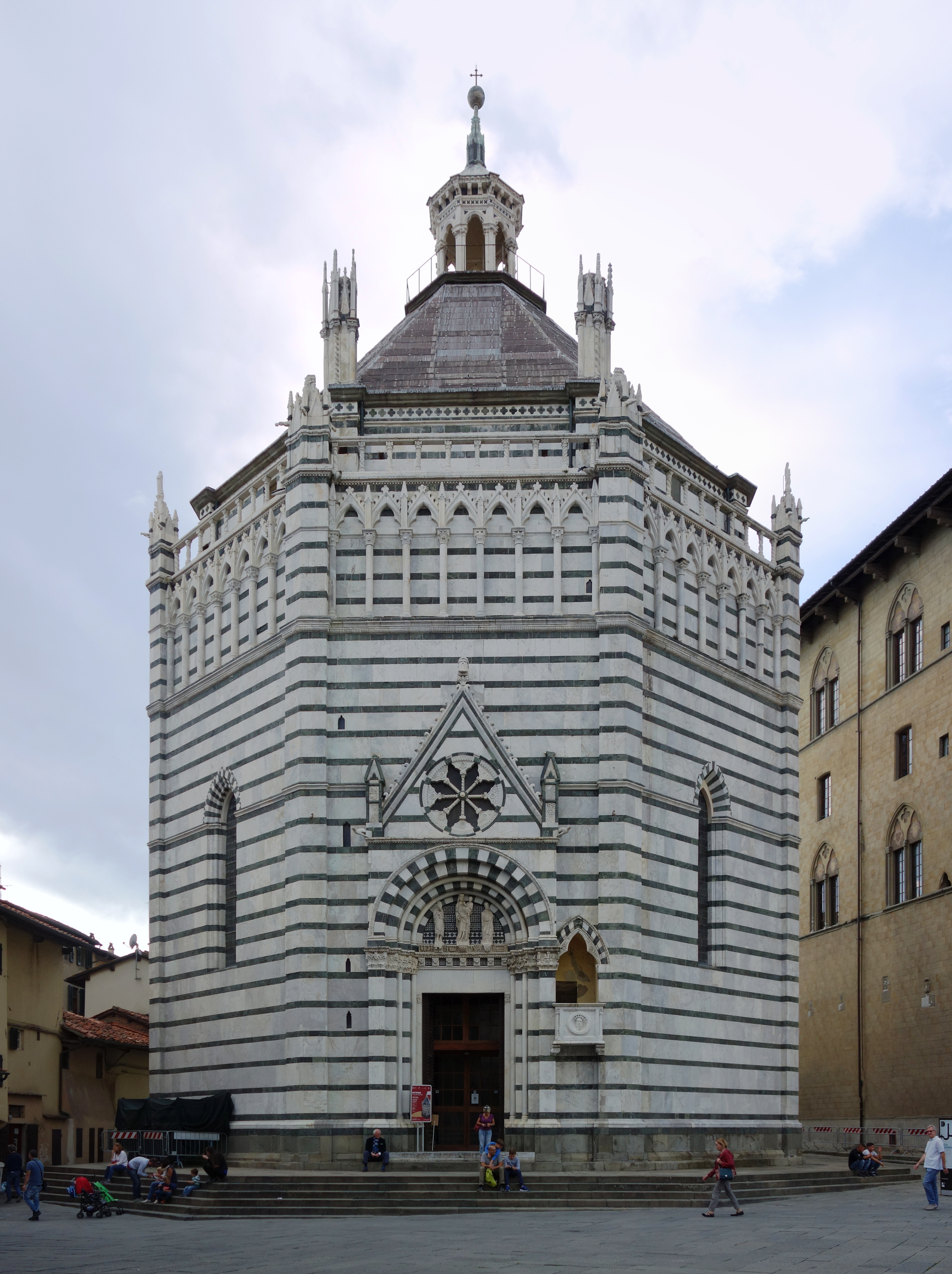
The octagonal Baptistery San Giovanni in Corte

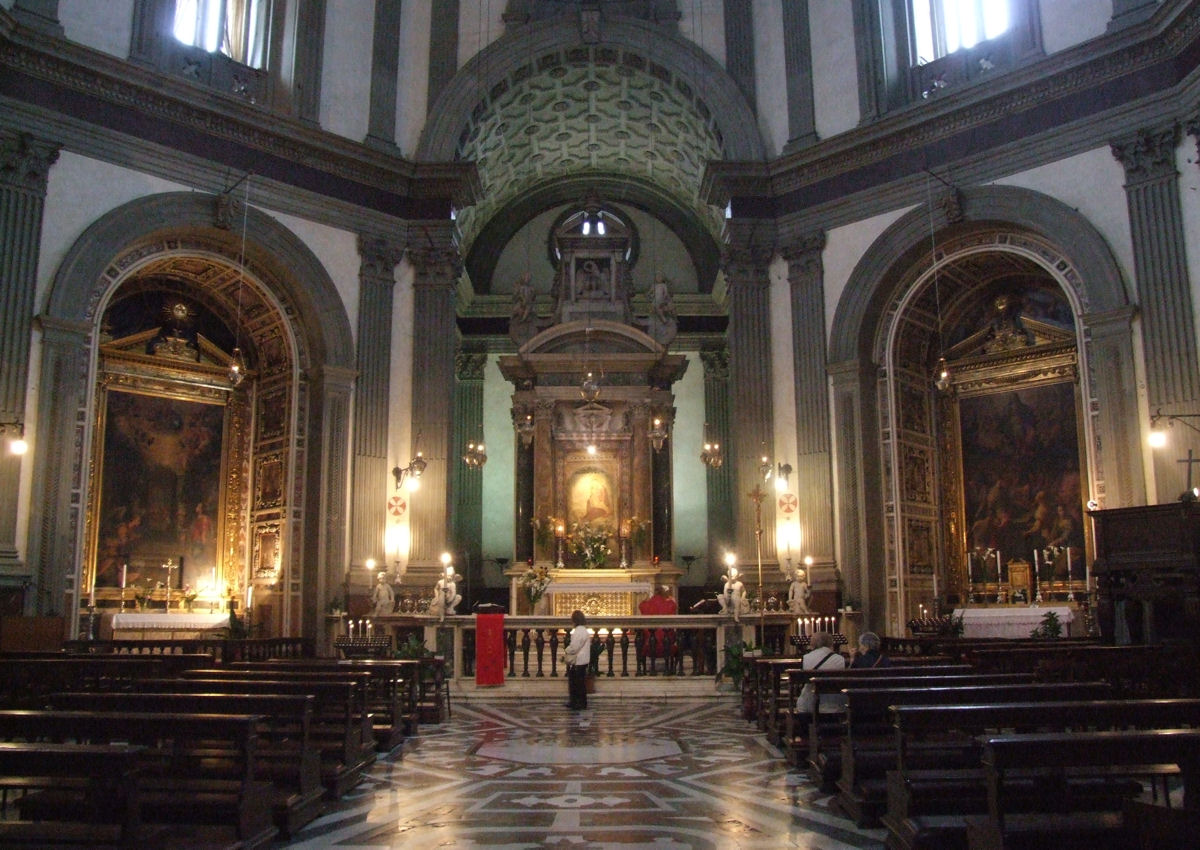
Interior of Basilica of Our Lady of Humility

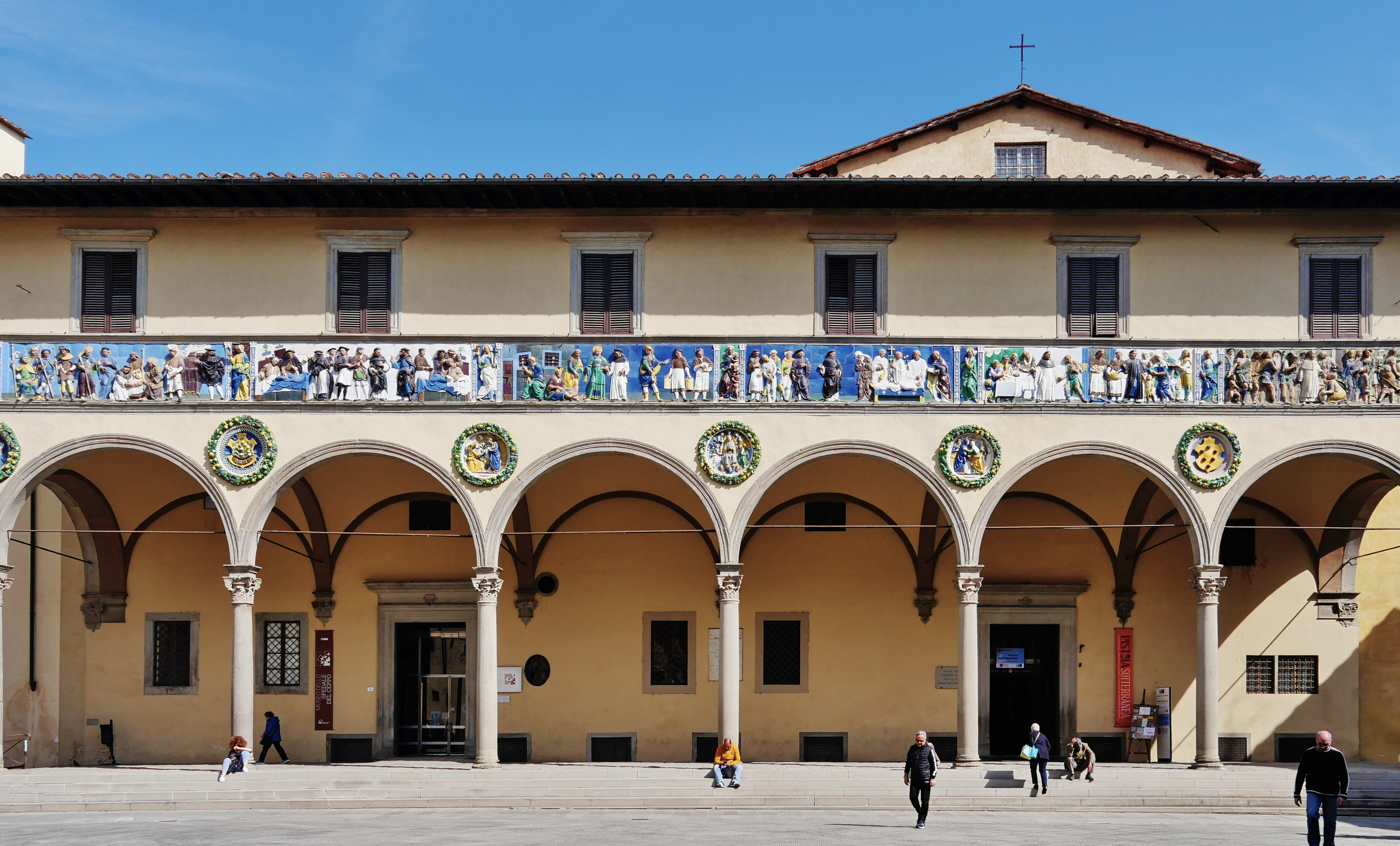
The Ospedale del Ceppo

Pistoia (US: /pɪˈstɔɪə, piːˈstoʊjɑː/; Italian: [pisˈtoːja]) is a city and comune in the Italian region of Tuscany, the capital of a province of the same name, located about 30 kilometres (19 mi) north-west of Florence and is crossed by the Ombrone Pistoiese, a tributary of the River Arno. It is a typical Italian medieval city, and it attracts many tourists, especially in the summer. The city is famous throughout Europe for its plant nurseries.

== History ==
Pistoria (in Latin other possible forms are Pistorium or Pistoriae) was a centre of Gallic, Ligurian and Etruscan settlements before becoming a Roman colony in the 6th century BC, along the important road Via Cassia: in 62 BC the demagogue Catiline and his fellow conspirators were slain nearby. From the 5th century the city was a bishopric, and during the Lombardic kingdom it was a royal city and had several privileges. Pistoia's most splendid age began in 1177 when it proclaimed itself a free commune: in the following years it became an important political centre, erecting walls and several public and religious buildings.

In 1254 the Ghibelline town of Pistoia was conquered by the Guelph Florence; this did not pacify the town, but led to marked civil violence between "Black" and "White" Guelph factions, pitting different noble families against one another. This on-going conflict was mentioned in the medieval Italian epic poem, Dante's Inferno. In the Inferno, Dante encounters a particularly violent member of the Black faction of Pistoia, Vanni Fucci, tangled up in a knot of snakes while cursing God, who states: (I am a) beast and Pistoia my worthy lair. Pistoia remained a Florentine holding except for a brief period in the 14th century, when a former abbott, Ormanno Tedici, became Lord of the city. This did not last long, since his nephew Filippo sold the town to Castruccio Castracani of Lucca. The town was officially annexed to Florence in 1530.

One of the most famous families of the city was that of the Rospigliosi, owners of agricultural estates and wool merchants; the Rospigliosi provided a pope in 1667 with Giulio Rospigliosi, who briefly reigned as Clement IX (1667–69), and gave several cardinals to the church.

In 1786 a famous episcopal synod was convened in Pistoia.

According to one theory, Pistoia lent its name to the pistol, which started to be manufactured in Pistoia during the 16th century. But today, it is also notable for the extensive plant nurseries spreading around it. Consequently, Pistoia is also famous for its flower markets, as is the nearby Pescia.

== Geography ==
Pistoia borders with the municipalities of Agliana, Alto Reno Terme, Cantagallo, Lizzano in Belvedere, Marliana, Montale, Quarrata, Sambuca Pistoiese, San Marcello Piteglio and Serravalle Pistoiese.

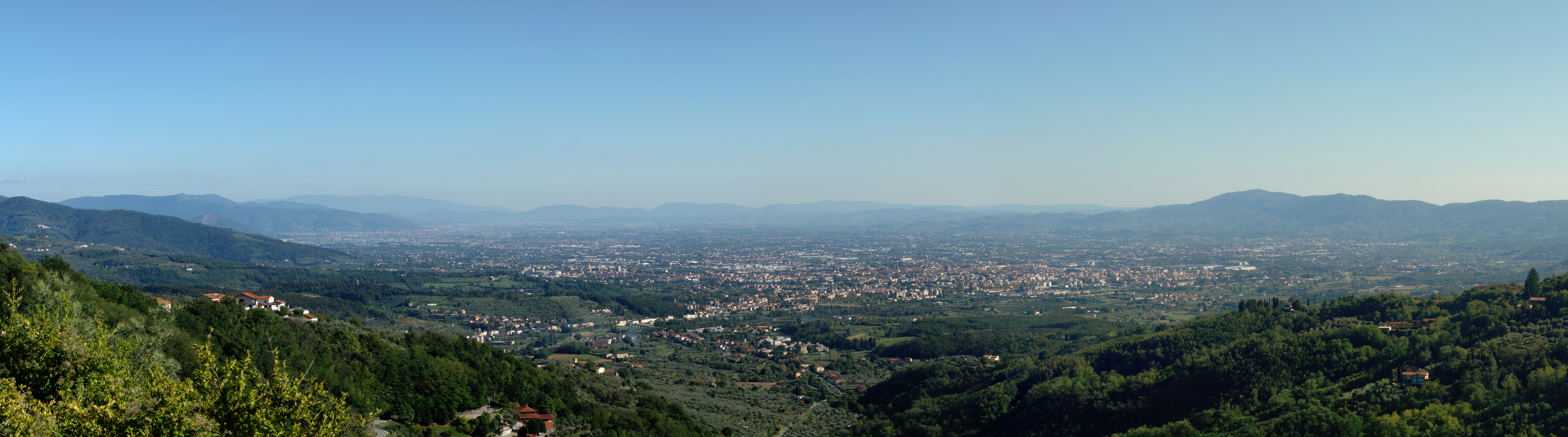
A panoramic view of Pistoia from the northwest.

== Government ==
=== Frazioni (Districts) ===
Name	Population
Sant'Agostino	
Sant'Alessio in Bigiano	
Badia a Pacciana	
Baggio	
Villa di Baggio	
Bargi	
Barile	
San Biagio	
Bonelle	
Bottegone	6.000
Campiglio	
Canapale	
Candeglia	
Capostrada	
Castagno di Piteccio	
Gello	
Germinaia	
Le Grazie	
Chiazzano	
Chiesina Montalese	
Chiodo	
Cignano	
Cireglio	
Collina	
Corsini Bianchi	
Corsini Neri	
Fabbrica	
San Felice	
Le Fornaci	
Lupicciano	
Masiano	
Casa Nuove di Masiano	
Masotti	
San Mommè	177
Nespolo	
Orsigna	
Piazza	
San Pierino Casa al Vescovo	
Piestro	
Piteccio	
Piuvica	
Pontelungo	
Pontenuovo	
Pracchia	268
Pupigliana	
Ramini	
San Rocco	
Santomato	
Saturnana	
Spazzavento	
Sazzana	
Torbecchia	
Valdibrana	
Villanova di Valdibrana	
Vicofaro	

== Culture ==
Literature

In Anatole France's novel The Wicker-Work Woman, the Ospedale del Ceppo in Pistoia is mentioned for its "vigor and truth" depicted on the "frieze of painted terracotta that surrounds the hospital".

Cinema

Pistoia has been a setting for numerous works of fiction and movies, including films, such as I Love You in All the Languages in the World, Amici miei, and Medici: Masters of Florence.

Media

In Pistoia there are the editorial offices of two local newspapers (La Nazione and Il Tirreno), a national weekly (La Vita), a television station (TV Libera Pistoia) with regional coverage on DTT and streaming on its website., Radio Diffusione Pistoia has been operational since the mid-1970s on FM, digitally on the mux DAB+ RadioDigToscana, on the station's free app and in streaming from site.

Small publishing houses are also active such as, for example, "Micco", "Settegiorni", "Via del Vento", "Edizioni Via Laura"; The Historical Institute of the Resistance and Contemporary Age in the province of Pistoia also publishes books with the publishing house "I.S.R.Pt Editore" and a historical magazine (Farestoria).

For 110 years, the Pistoia Society of Homeland History has regularly published the Bullettino Storico Pistoiese every year.

Music

- Pistoia Blues, an international music festival held since 1980. It is one of the most important European blues festivals. Artists such as B.B. King, Bob Dylan and David Bowie have attended and performed at the festival.

Giostra dell'Orso

"Joust of the Bear", a ceremony that is mentioned even in a chronicle dating back to 1300, when a dozen riders organized a ritual combat against a bear. Despite many changes, this traditional ceremony was staged every year until 1666, when the abandonment was recorded by the ritual celebration of the people. It was revived in 1947, and takes place on July 25 Piazza del Duomo, where the best horsemen of the city's traditional quarters tilt with lances at a target held up by a dummy shaped like a bear.

Events

- Spighe Festival: a celebration conceived by Niccolò Puccini that is held every 200 years. The last celebration was in 2022.
- Italian Social Week of 1907 (first edition) and Social Week 2007 (in commemoration of the centenary of the initiative).
- Road Cycling World Championships (September 21 to 29, 2013) were held in the city, as well as in Florence, Lucca, and Montecatini Terme.
- Holy Year of St. James (January 9 to December 27, 2021) was celebrated in honor of the patron saint, St. James the Greater, which that year fell on a Sunday (July 25).
- Pistoia, Italian Book Capital 2026: the slogan "Reading is an adventure!" was chosen for all scheduled activities. The Radio Diffusione Pistoia schedule will be enriched throughout 2026 with a cultural program, entirely dedicated to Pistoia Capital of the Book, which will be broadcast every Tuesday with repeats on Wednesdays and Fridays.

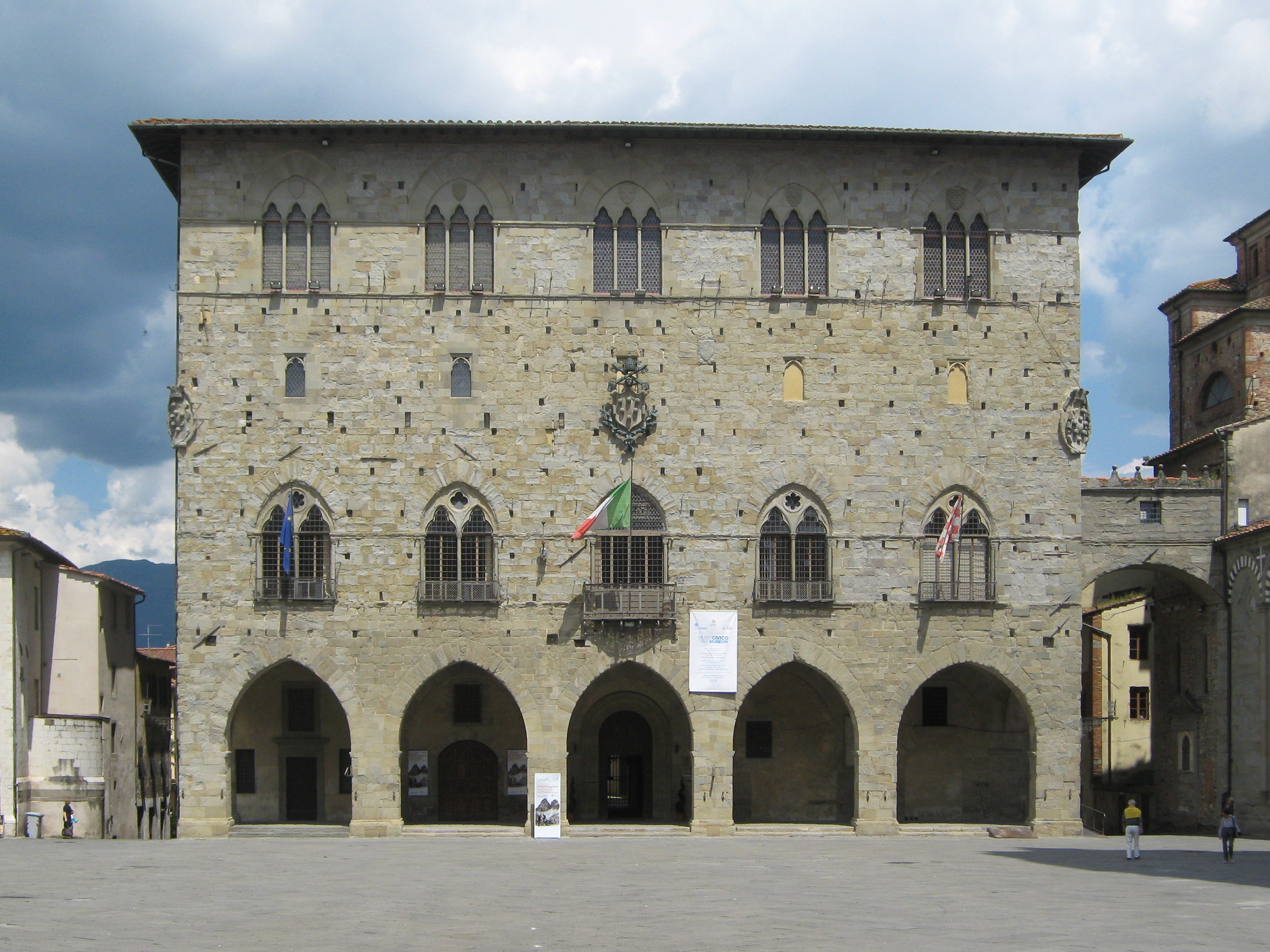
Palazzo Comunale (13th/14th ct.)

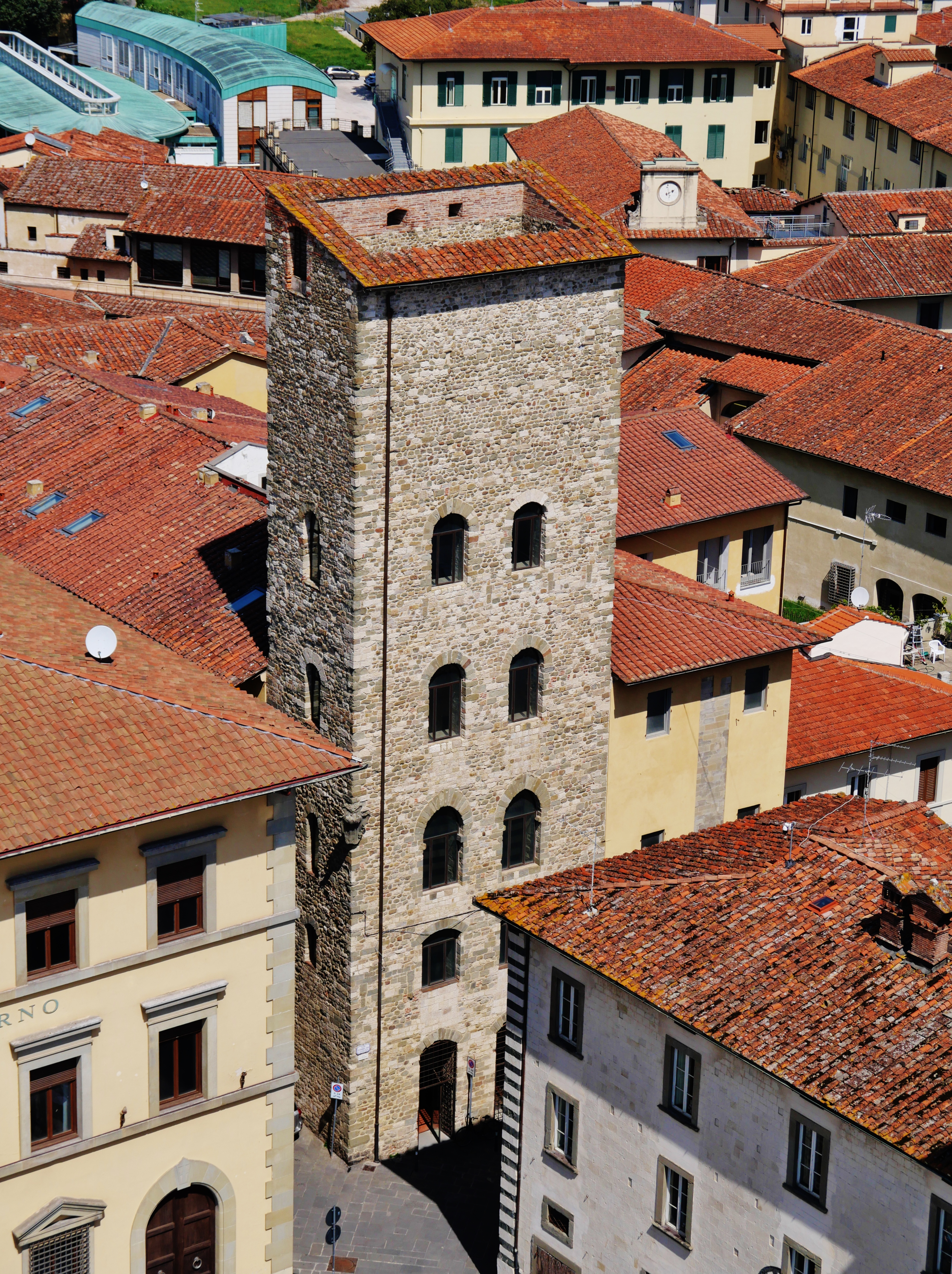
Tower of Catilina

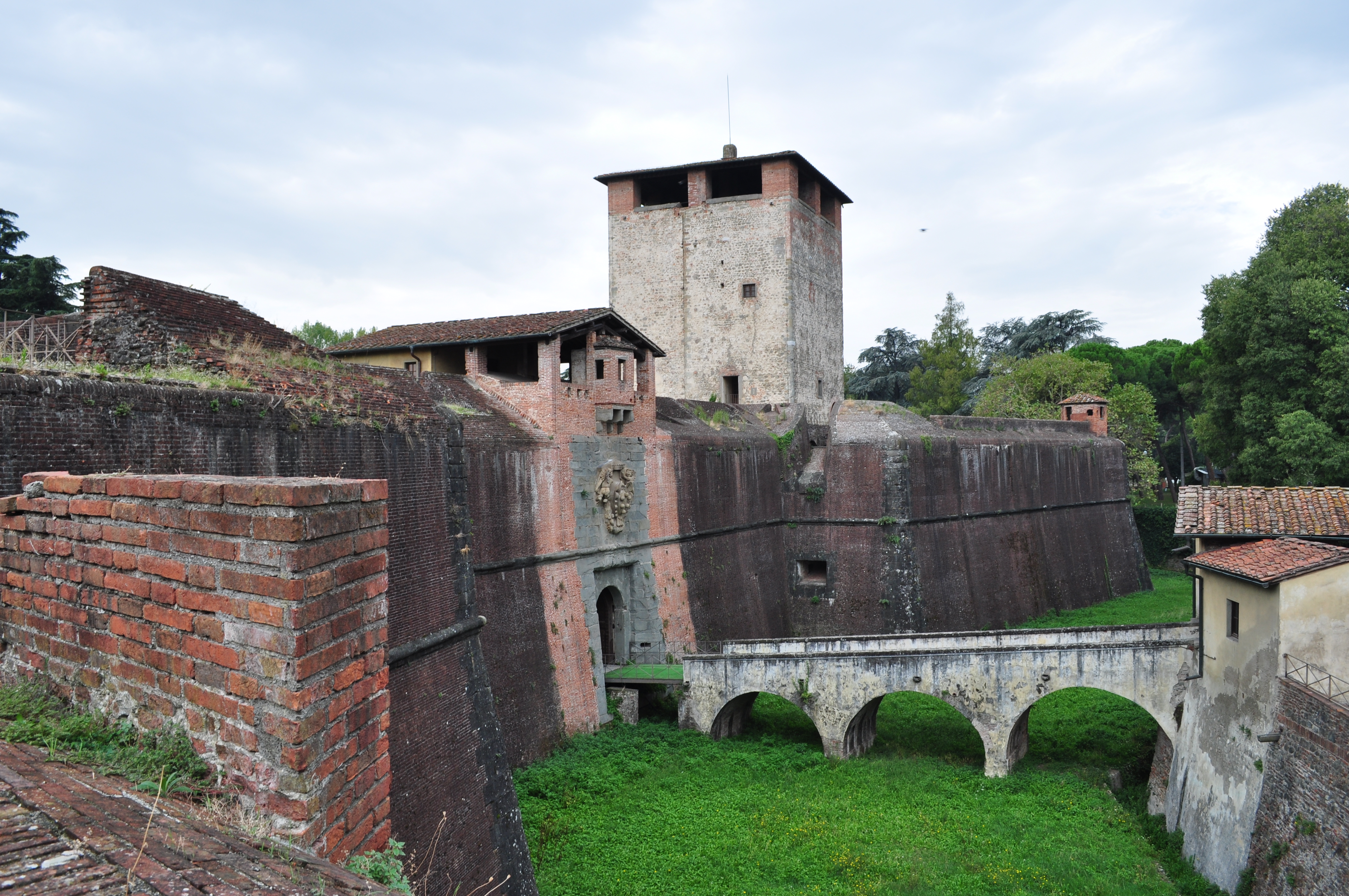
Santa Barbara Fortress

== Main sights ==
Although less visited than other cities in Tuscany, the medieval city within Pistoia's old walls is well-preserved.

=== Piazza del Duomo ===
The large Piazza del Duomo, dominated by the cathedral, is lined with other medieval buildings, such as the Palazzo Comunale which houses the town museum (Museo Civico) and the Palazzo del Podestà.

The original Cathedral of San Zeno (5th century) burned down in 1108, but was rebuilt during the 12th century, and received incremental improvements until the 17th century. The façade has a prominent Romanesque style, while the interior received heavy Baroque additions which were removed during the 1960s. Its outstanding feature is the Altar of St James, an exemplar of the silversmith's craft begun in 1287 but not finished until the 15th century. Its various sections contain 628 figures, the total weighing nearly a ton. The Romanesque belfry, standing at some 67 metres (220 ft), was erected over an ancient Lombard tower.

In the square is also the 14th-century Baptistry San Giovanni in Corte, with white and green striped marble revetment characteristic of the Tuscan Gothic style.

The Palazzo dei Vescovi ("Bishops' Palace"), is characterized by a Gothic loggiato on the first floor. It is known from 1091, initially as a fortified noble residence. In the 12th century it received a more decorated appearance, with mullioned windows and frescoes, of which traces remain. It was later modified in the mid-12th century (St. James Chapel, mentioned by Dante Alighieri in the XXIV canto of his Inferno) and in the 13th century; to the latter restoration belongs the white marble-decorated staircase, one of the most ancient examples in Italy in civil architecture. In the 14th century, the Chapel of St. Nicholas was decorated with stories of the namesake saint and other martyrs.

The Tower of Catilina dates to the High Middle Ages, and stands 30 metres (98 ft) high.

=== Religious buildings ===
- Basilica of Our Lady of Humility (Madonna dell'Umiltà) (1509), finished by Giorgio Vasari with a 59-metre (194 ft) high cupola. The original project was by Giuliano da Sangallo, but works were begun in 1495 by Ventura Vitoni. The dome was commissioned by Cosimo I de' Medici to Vasari, the lantern completed in 1568 and the church consecrated in 1582. In the apse is a painting by Bernardino del Signoraccio (1493).
- Santissima Annunziata, former Baroque church known for its Chiostro dei Morti ("Cloister of the Dead").
- San Bartolomeo in Pantano (12th century)
- San Giovanni Battista (15th century). Damaged during World War II bombardments, it is now used as an exhibition center.
- San Giovanni Battista al Tempio (11th century), owned for a while by the Knights Templar and then by the Hospitaller Knights.
- San Benedetto (14th century, restored in 1630). It houses an Annunciation (1390) by Giovanni di Bartolomeo Cristiani, a St Benedict with the Redeemer (16th-century) by a Florentine painter, and in the cloister Histories of the Order of the Knights of St Benedict by Giovan Battista Vanni (1660).
- San Domenico
- San Francesco (begun 1289). Franciscan church has an unfinished façade with bichrome marble decoration. It has frescoes with Stories of the Life of St Francis in the main chapel and other 14th and 15th century frescoes.
- San Giovanni Fuoricivitas (12th–14th century), Romanesque church
- San Leone (14th century) church enlarged in the 16th–18th centuries. Its Baroque-Roccoco interior houses some notable canvases by Giovanni Lanfranco, Stefano Marucelli and Vincenzo Meucci.
- Santa Maria delle Grazie
- Santa Maria in Ripalta (11th century). It houses a large Ascent of Christ fresco in the apse, attributed to Manfredino d'Alberto (1274).
- San Paolo
- San Pier Maggiore
- Pieve di Sant'Andrea, housing Giovanni Pisano's Pulpit of St. Andrew.
- Pieve of San Michele in Groppoli, ancient chapel now parish church.
- La Vergine

=== Others ===
- The 14th-century walls. These had originally four gates, Porta al Borgo, Porta San Marco, Porta Carratica and Porta Lucchese, all demolished at the beginning of the 20th century.
- Ospedale del Ceppo (13th century)
- Palazzo Panciatichi
- Medici Fortress of Santa Barbara, built at first in 1331 by the Florentines, but destroyed by the Pistoiese citizens in 1343. It was rebuilt by order of Cosimo I de' Medici from 1539, and later enlarged by Bernardo Buontalenti. It sustained one single siege by the Barberini troops in 1643, before being disarmed by Grand Duke Peter Leopold in 1734. Later it was used as a barracks and military jail, while today it serves as a venue for cinema shows during the summer.
- Accademia dei Risvegliati
- Palazzo Rospigliosi
  - Palazzo Rospigliosi a Via del Duca
  - Palazzo Rospigliosi a Ripa del Sale
- Monument in Honour of Brazilians, soldiers and pilots killed in action during the Italian Campaign of World War II
- Brazilian Military Cemetery

== Sport ==
Football

The city's football team US Pistoiese 1921 plays in Serie D, the fourth flight of Italian football.

Basketball

The city's basketball team Pistoia Basket 2000 plays in Serie A1.

== Transportation ==
=== Buses ===
Consorzio Pistoiese Trasporti, also known as COPIT, was a company that operated since 1969 the local public transport in Pistoia and in its province. It was transformed as Società per azioni in 2000 with private and public capital, mainly by the fifteen Comuni, where operated and 30% by CTT Nord. Since 2005 made part in two consortium: BluBus and PiùBus, the first operated in the Province of Pistoia and the other in the Empoli area.

Since 1 November 2021 the public local transport is managed by Autolinee Toscane.

=== Train ===
The railway station is located on the Viareggio–Florence railway and it is at the southern end of the Porrettana railway, the original line between Florence and Bologna.

== Notable residents ==
- Meo Abbracciavacca, 14th century poet
- Enrico Betti
- Mauro Bolognini, film director
- Giosuè Carducci
- Cino da Pistoia
- Pope Clement IX
- Ippolito Desideri
- Renato Fondi
- Niccolò Fortiguerra
- Vanni Fucci, fictional character
- Licio Gelli
- Lodovico Giustini
- Marino Marini
- Giovanni Michelucci
- Maria Maddalena Morelli
- Filippo Pacini
- Kobe Bryant

== Twin towns and sister cities ==
Pistoia is twinned with:

- Kruševac, Serbia
- Pau, France (1975)
- Zittau, Germany

== See also ==
- Roman Catholic Diocese of Pistoia

== Sources ==
- David Herlihy. Medieval and Renaissance Pistoia: the social history of an Italian town. New Haven and London, Yale University Press, 1967.
