= Christ Appearing to his Mother after his Resurrection =

Painting by Titian

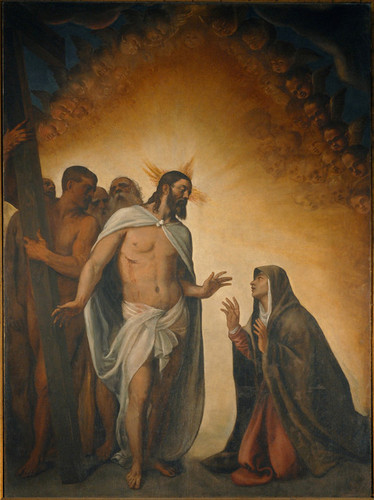
Christ Appearing to his Mother after his Resurrection (1554) by Titian

Christ Appearing to his Mother after his Resurrection (Italian: Il Risorto appare alla Madre) is an oil on canvas painting by Titian, from 1554. He painted it whilst in Medole in Mantua, where he was staying with the archpriest of Assunzione della Vergine, the town's parish church where it still hangs. The painting forms part of a series of works the artist planned in his old age, and is his only altarpiece still in situ in the province and city of Mantua.

Along with the titular figures, the left-hand side of the piece also shows Noah, Abraham, Adam (carrying Christ's cross) and Eve – all just released during Christ's Harrowing of Hell. It formed part of the major 1935 retrospective of the artist's work in Venice. It was stolen in April 1968, but returned on 12 May the same year, albeit damaged during the theft. It was subsequently sent to the Istituto Centrale del Restauro in Rome until being re-hung in the church in 1971. It then appeared in Mantua as part of the 1974 exhibition "Tesori d'arte nella terra dei Gonzaga".

== See also ==
- List of works by Titian
