= San Bartolomeo in Pantano =

Church building in Pistoia, Italy

Coordinates: 43.9341°N 10.9202°E

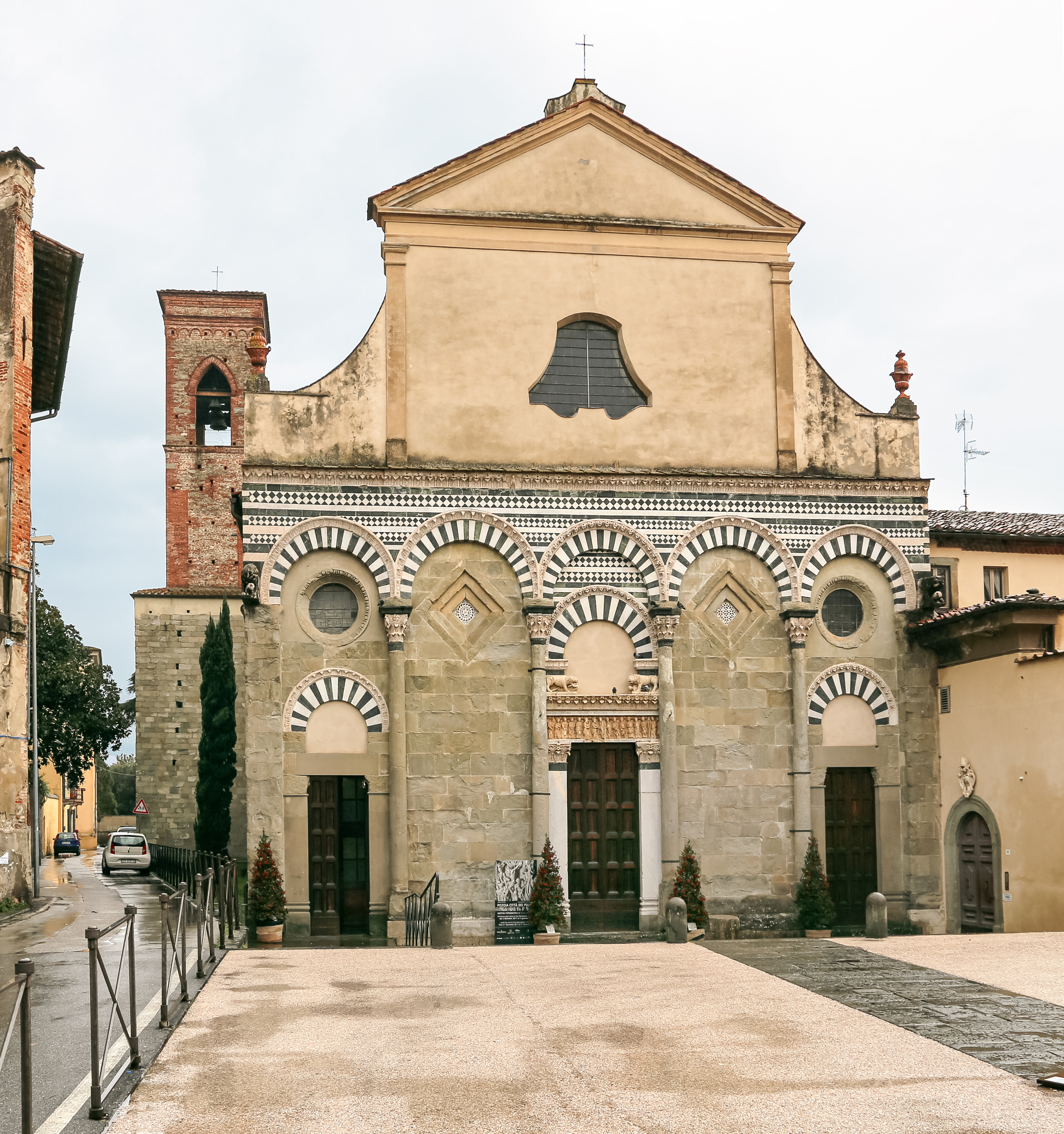
Facade of the church in Pistoia

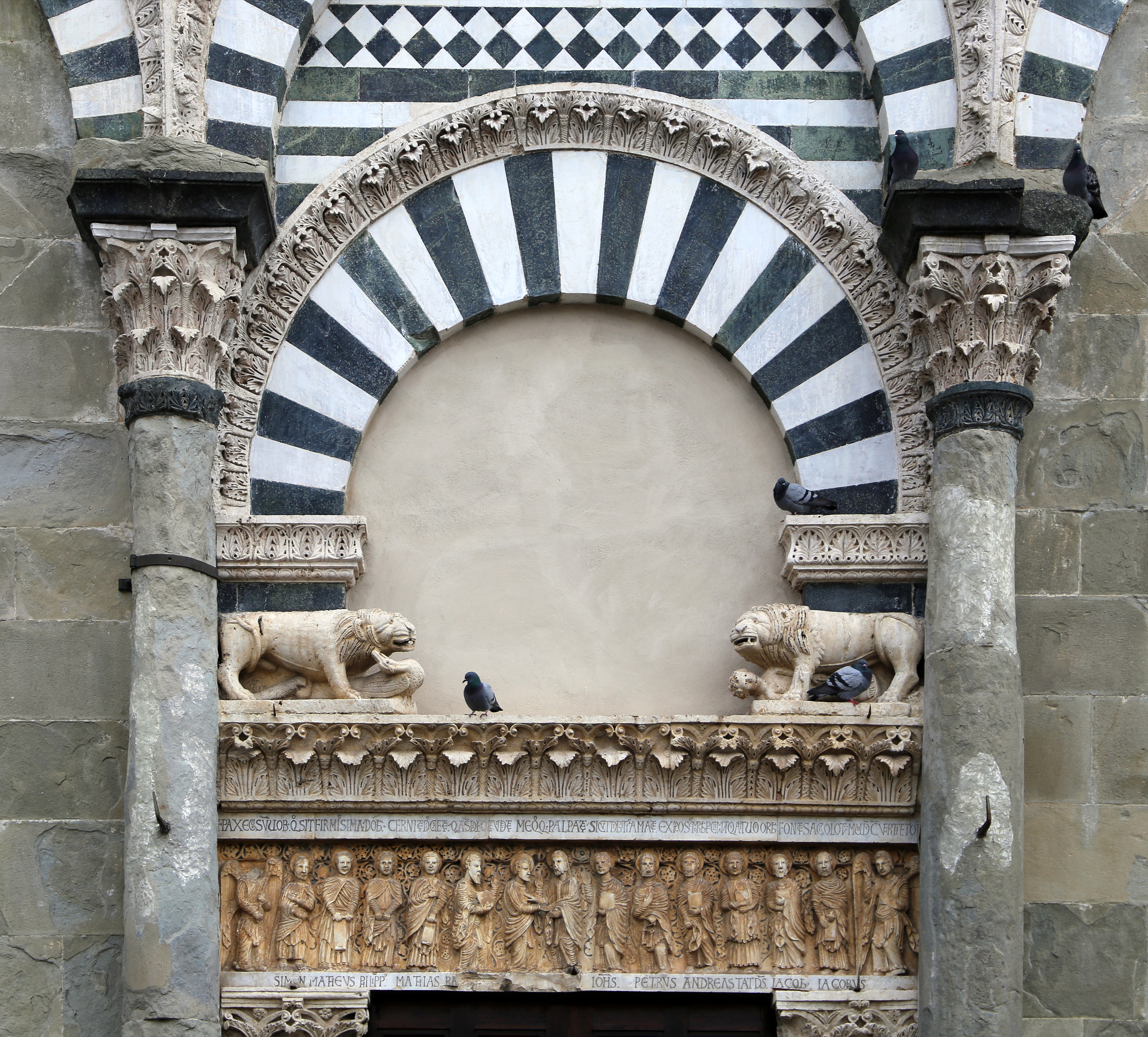
The sculpted architrave of the portal and stilted outer arch resulting in voussoirs getting larger

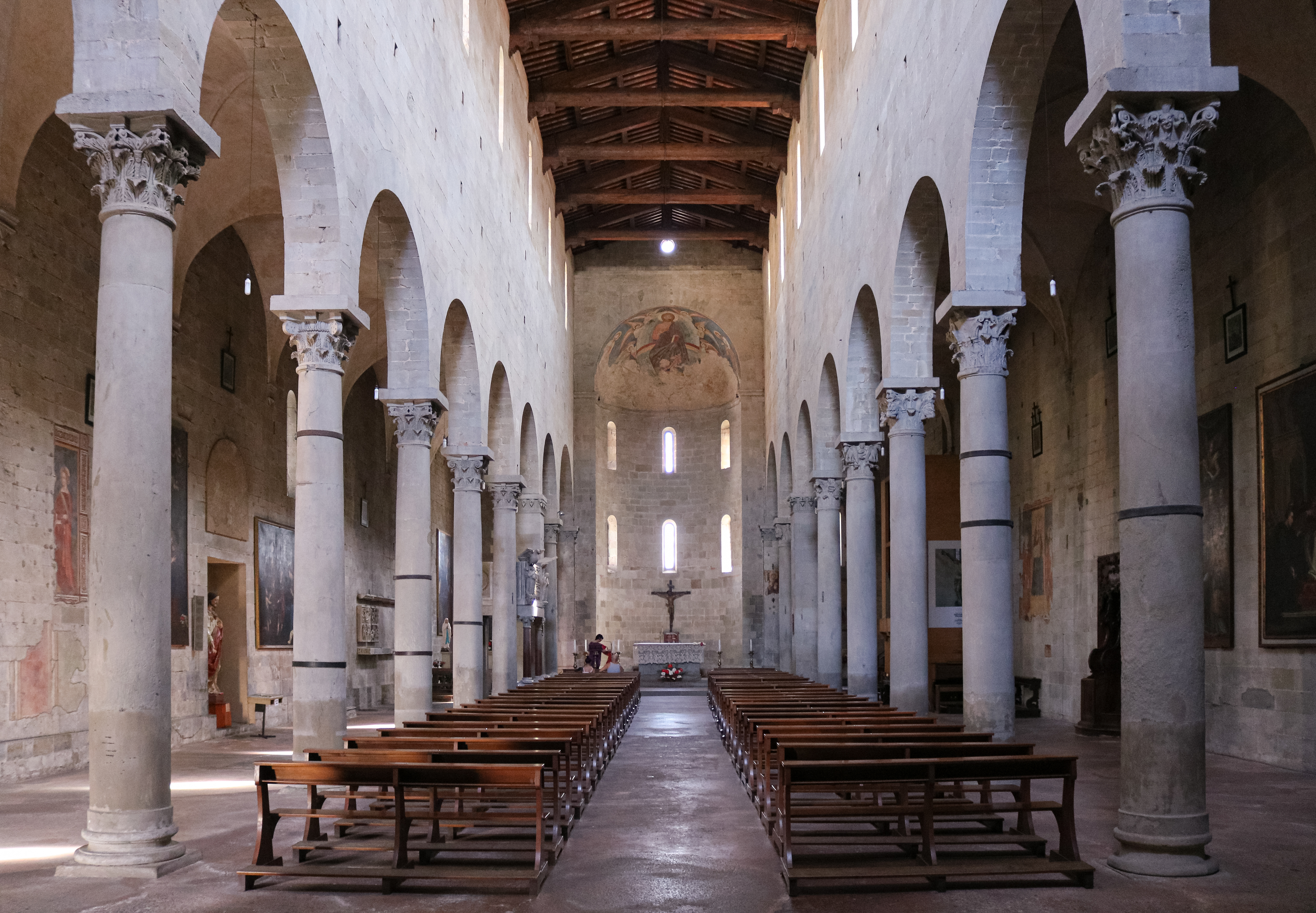
Interior view down the nave to the apse

San Bartolomeo in Pantano is a Romanesque and Gothic style, Roman Catholic church in Pistoia, Tuscany, central Italy, dedicated to St. Bartholomew the Apostle. The pantano of the name refers to the once marshy area in which the building was located.

== History ==
The church and the adjacent Benedictine abbey were founded during the Lombard domination of Italy, between 726 and 767, by the Lombard physician Gaiduald (or Guidoaldo). The Benedictines were established under the protection of the Marquises of Tuscany. In 1001, the Margrave Hugh died in the abbey. The complex was first restored in the 12th century by abbot Buono.

In 1433 the Benedictines, whose numbers had dwindled, were replaced by Canons Regular of the Lateran, which were related to the Augustinian canons. These were derived from the monastery associated with bishop and saint Fridianus of Lucca. In the 17th-century, the monastery was given to the Vallumbrosan Order, which remained there, when in 1810 the church became a parish church.

== Description ==
The church gained its present appearance at the time of abbot Buono in 1159, rebuilt in the Pistoiese Romanesque style. Characteristic of this style is the façade, divided into five compartments with arches supported by slender columns, and with a marble bichrome decoration. The portal in the facade is graced with notable Romanesque sculptures; the architrave has a row of standing individuals in antique clothes, depicting Jesus in the midst of the Twelve Apostles flanked by two angels (dated to 1167). Although missing his name on the base, Thomas is identifiable as the one next to Jesus facing him; while the Apostle Matthew takes the place of Judas Iscariot (who betrayed Jesus), signifying an episode after the Gospel. Above the lintel and a frieze of acanthus leaves two male lions are facing each other, the right one atop a recumbent man, the other atop a large bird.

The bichromatic incrustation of the facade, a common trait of (not only) Tuscan ecclesiastical buildings –here in white marble and green serpentine–, is limited here to the blind arches above the portals and the row of five blind arches resting on four slender round columns and pilasters at the corners, which divide the wall in somewhat equal parts, with the two smaller doors in the outer divisions, while the arches of the second and forth are slightly wider and higher than the other three. At the height of the capitals decorative squares

=== Interior ===
The interior was much changed over the centuries, but a restoration held in 1951–1961 brought it to the original appearance. In the apse was found a Christ in Majesty between Saints and Angels from the late 13th century, attributed to Manfredino d'Alberto. The pulpit sculpted in the mid 13th century by Guido da Como was also restored. The wooden crucifix above the high altar is from an unknown sculptor with a style resembling that of Giovanni Pisano.

== See also ==
- San Pier Maggiore, Pistoia
