= Medole =

Medole Médule (Emilian)
- Comune
- Comune di Medole
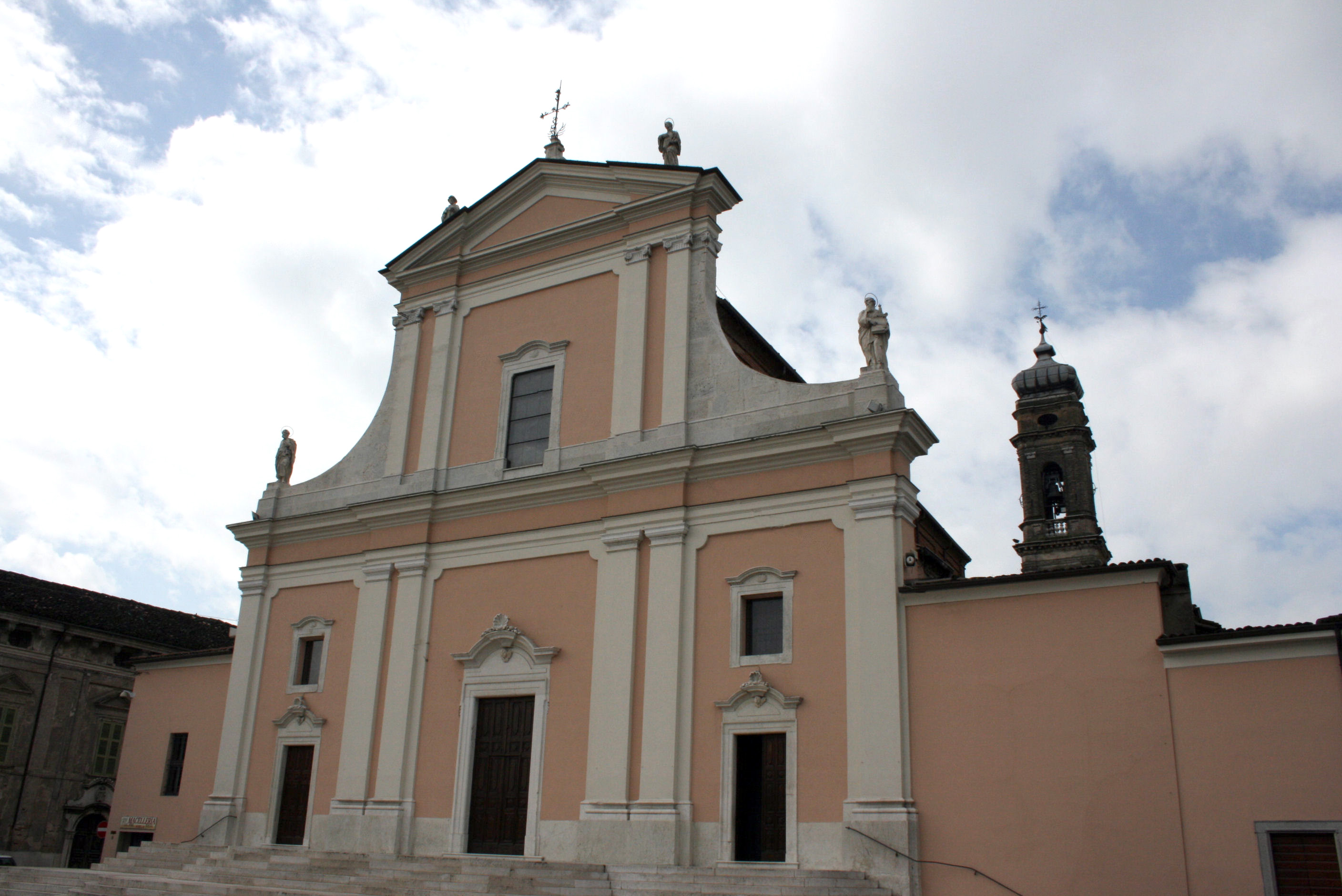
- The town's parish church, housing Christ Appearing to his Mother after his Resurrection by Titian

- Location within Italy Location within Lombardy
- Coordinates: 45°20′N 10°31′E
- Country: Italy
- Region: Lombardy
- Province: Mantua (MN)

Government
  - Mayor: Luca Vivaldini (Lega per Salvini Premier, Fratelli d’Italia, Forza Italia)

Area
  - Total: 25.73 km^{2} (9.93 sq mi)
- Elevation: 75 m (246 ft)

Population (July 31, 2025)
  - Total: 4,233
  - Density: 164.5/km^{2} (426.1/sq mi)
- Demonym: Medolesi
- Time zone: UTC+1 (CET)
  - Summer (DST): UTC+2 (CEST)
- Postal code: 46046
- Dialing code: 0376
- Website: Official website

Medole (Upper Mantovano: Médule) is a comune (municipality) is an Italian municipality of 4,122 inhabitants in the province of Mantua in Lombardy.

It is located in Alto Mantovano and is part of the Garda Community (an association of entities in the Lake Garda basin).

In 2016, the union of the municipalities of Medole, Ponti sul Mincio and Solferino called "Unione dei comuni Castelli Morenici" was formed.

== Geography ==
The territory of Medole belongs to the subcolline area located at the foot of the heights bordering Lake Garda toward the Po Valley and is bordered to the northwest by Castiglione delle Stiviere, to the northeast by Solferino and Cavriana, to the east by Guidizzolo, to the south by Ceresara, and to the southwest by Castel Goffredo.

The town is about 30 km from Mantua, 35 km from Brescia, 55 km from Cremona, and 45 km from Verona.

== History ==
=== Roman Period ===
The artifacts and inscriptions found suggest the existence of a settlement organized into institutions of Latin culture and language as early as the 1st century. The first nucleus of the town came into being in the present northeastern part of the settlement, where the present Romanesque Pieve stands, built around the 10th century, perhaps on the foundations of a Roman temple.

In an area adjacent to the Romanesque Pieve, in the 1980s, the remains of a large Roman villa were found, which, after the immediate constraint decided by the Ministero pe i beni culturali e abientali, is waiting to be brought to light.

=== Middle Ages ===
The oldest document where Medole is mentioned is a deed dated May 31, 841, by which the bishop of Brescia Ramperto donated to the Benedictine Monks, whom he had brought from France, some properties in the countryside, including the House of San Vito.

=== From 15th–17th century ===
==== The Gonzagas ====
At the dawn of the 15th century, precisely in 1404, the Duchess of Milan, Caterina Visconti, in payment of a debt previously contracted by her husband, Gian Galeazzo Visconti, ceded the lands of Lonato, along with those of Medole, Castel Goffredo, Castiglione delle Stiviere and Solferino to the mercenary leader Francesco Gonzaga, thus beginning the long Gonzaga rule of Medole.

==== The refugees ====
Around the second half of the 15th century the municipality, for reasons not known, probably due to a severe famine in the Brescian valleys, was subject to an unexpected and massive immigration that, in a short time, led to a significant increase in the population of Medolese. Already scarce food supplies and mistrust of outsiders caused a sharp separation between the two populations that, in 1481, was regulated by a ruling of the Magistracy. The inhabitants of Medole were divided between the natives, called "men of commune", and the Brescian immigrants, called "millstone's men". The latter constituted the poorest section and were treated as outsiders until their descendants reached 150 years from the settlement in Medole of the progenitor. In 1570 the 110 families of the "millstone's men" who complained about the harshness of living conditions, sent a petition to the Duke of Mantua, which, however, was rejected, confirming the privileges of the "men of commune". Of the official end of this strange "apartheid" there is no record: it probably died out in the 17th century, with the completion of 150 years of residence.

A second substantial immigration took place at the end of the 17th century, when several families from Bergamo reached Medole in search of agricultural work in the uncultivated Campo di Medole, a vast expanse located in the northern area that was ceded by the municipality in lots of a size commensurate with the labor force of the requesting family.

==== The great plague ====
During the War of Succession of Mantua and Monferrato in 1629, the territory of Medole and neighboring municipalities suffered raids by Albrecht von Wallenstein's German and Polish mercenaries, led by the Count of Collalto, who perpetrated theft and killings and brought a severe plague epidemic.

=== 18th–19th century ===
==== The battles ====
Medole was the site of several episodes of warfare. On September 8, 1706, in the vast portion of the plain known as the Campo di Medole, a large part of the Battle of Castiglione, also known in some texts as the Battle of Medole or the Battle of Ghidizzole, took place as part of the War of the Spanish Succession and was led on the German side by the Landgrave Frederick of Hesse-Kassel and on the French side by the Count of Médavy.

On August 5, 1796, as part of the first Napoleonic campaign in Italy, Medole was the scene of episodes forming part of the larger Battle of Castiglione, between the forces of the young general Napoleon Bonaparte and the field marshal of the Austrian Empire, Dagobert von Wurmser, the left flank of the Austrian army being settled on Mount Medolano.

In the course of the Battle of Solferino and San Martino, the Battle of Medole was fought in the built-up area and in the eastern part of the Medolan territory, a clash between General Adolphe Niel's French IV Army Corps and Field Marshal Franz von Wimpffen's Austrian I Army, which began the fighting on June 24, 1859, while in the northern part of the territory the French II Corps of Marshal Patrice de Mac-Mahon's French Army was being measured against General Franz von Schlick's Austrian IInd Army.

The last battle of Medole took place on July 2, 1866. It was actually a circumscribed clash between Italian and Austrian cavalry divisions that was given special prominence, probably to partially compensate for the defeats suffered by the Italian army. It was as a result of the favorable outcome of that clash that the central square took its current name, Piazza della Vittoria.

=== 20th century ===
The 20th century began under good auspices because of economic improvements due to the activities of the Cooperativa Agricola Italiana, which in 1901 established an important rural cooperative enterprise in Medole, partly clearing agrarian labor from the control of landowners and encouraging the humbler classes of the population to study.

On February 28, 1918, the 113th Squadron arrived and remained until July 17, from March 22 the 23rd Squadron until May 25, and in early July, the 120th Squadron until August 25.

== Notable people ==
- Vindizio Nodari Pesenti – painter
- Giuseppe Brigoni - sculptor and painter
