= Sant'Erasmo, Castel Goffredo =

Church building in Castel Goffredo, Italy

Coordinates: 45°17′52″N 10°28′32″E

Chiesa Prepositurale di Sant'Erasmo
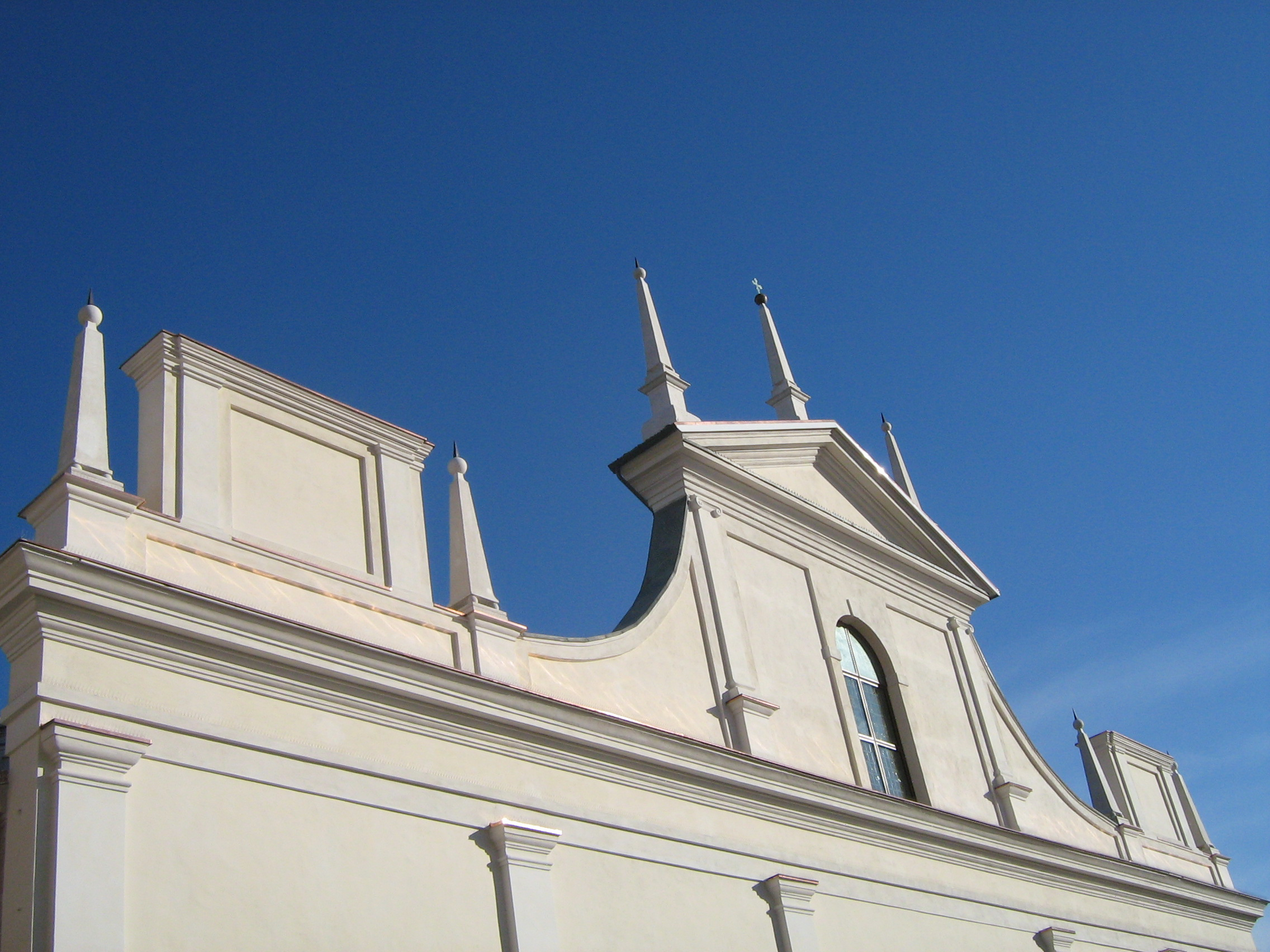

Religion
- Affiliation: Roman Catholic
- Leadership: Bishop Gianmarco Busca

Location
- Location: Piazza Mazzini
- Municipality: Castel Goffredo
- State: Italy
- Country: Mantua
- Interactive map of Chiesa Prepositurale di Sant'Erasmo
- Administration: Diocese of Mantua

Architecture
- Architect: Bernardino Facciotto
- Type: Church
- Style: Renaissance
- Groundbreaking: 15th century
- Completed: 1590
- Direction of façade: east

Website
- https://farecerchio.it/storia/

Sant'Erasmo is a Roman Catholic church located in Castel Goffredo, region of Lombardy, Italy.

== History ==
From the statutes of the Congregation of Santa Maria della Misericordia it appears that before 1288 there was a church in Castel Goffredo dedicated to Erasmus of Formia, which presumably stood within the perimeter of Castelvecchio (Castellum vetus), demolished in 1516 to make room for the garden by Prince Aloisio Gonzaga. The construction of the church was begun in the second half of the fifteenth century, at the time when the village began to develop outside the first circle of wallsof Castelvecchio; it was enlarged in 1516 with the construction of the presbytery and a new dome.

During the marquisate of Aloisio Gonzaga, the temple was embellished and enlarged with the addition of the two side chapels. In his will he left the sum of one hundred crowns to be employed in the work on the church. Cardinal Carlo Borromeo, during his visit in 1540, gave instructions for changes to be made inside and the work to be completed.

Rebuilt following the collapse of the dome between 1588 and 1590 by Bernardino Facciotto, architect of the Duke of Mantua Guglielmo Gonzaga, by the will of the Marquis Alfonso Gonzaga. Other sources would suggest the presence of his son Girolamo instead. The municipality also contributed to the work.

Inside artworks by Giuseppe Bazzani, Felice Riccio, Giuseppe Fali.

To the left of the main altar is the ancient Costanzo Antegnati pipe organ, built in 1595 by Caterina Gonzaga, daughter of Alfonso Gonzaga.

== Gallery ==
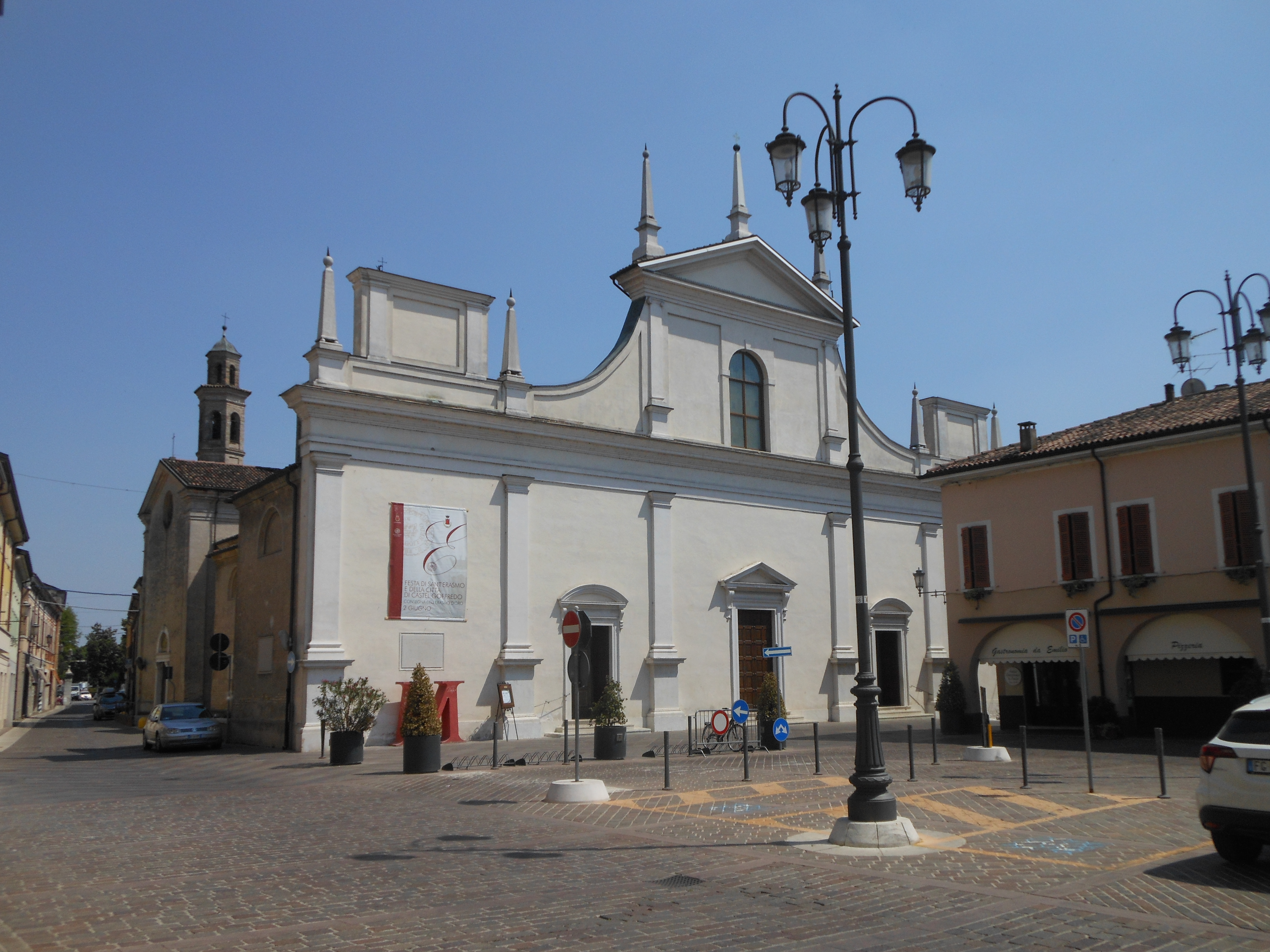
Facade

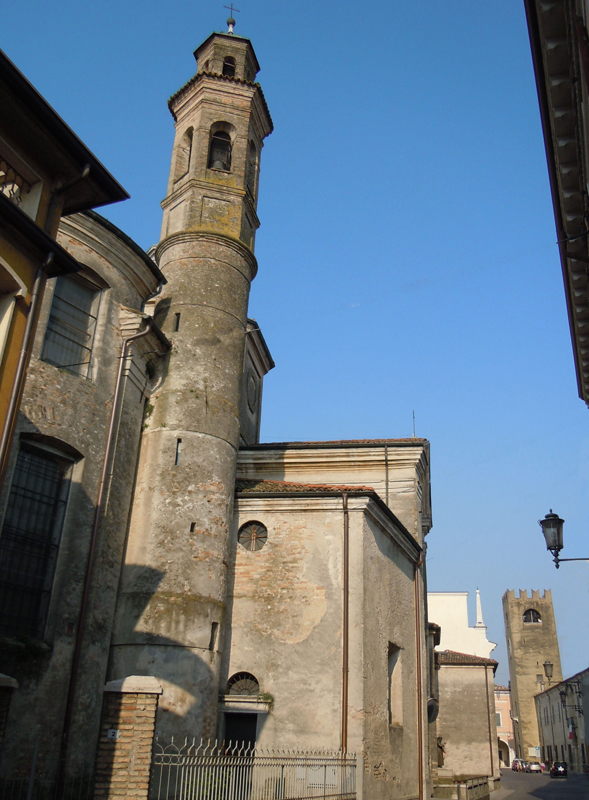
Bell tower

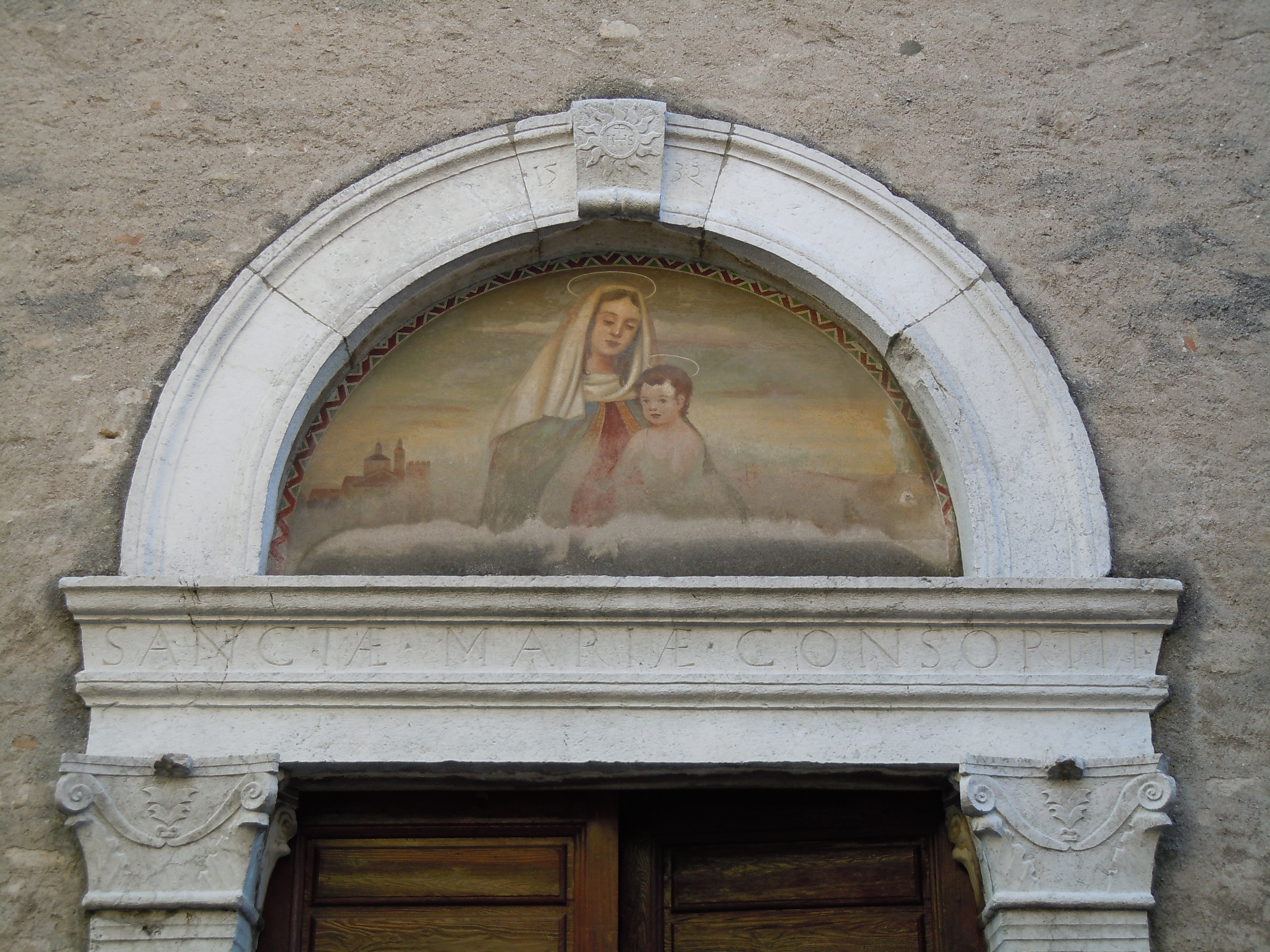
Marble portal

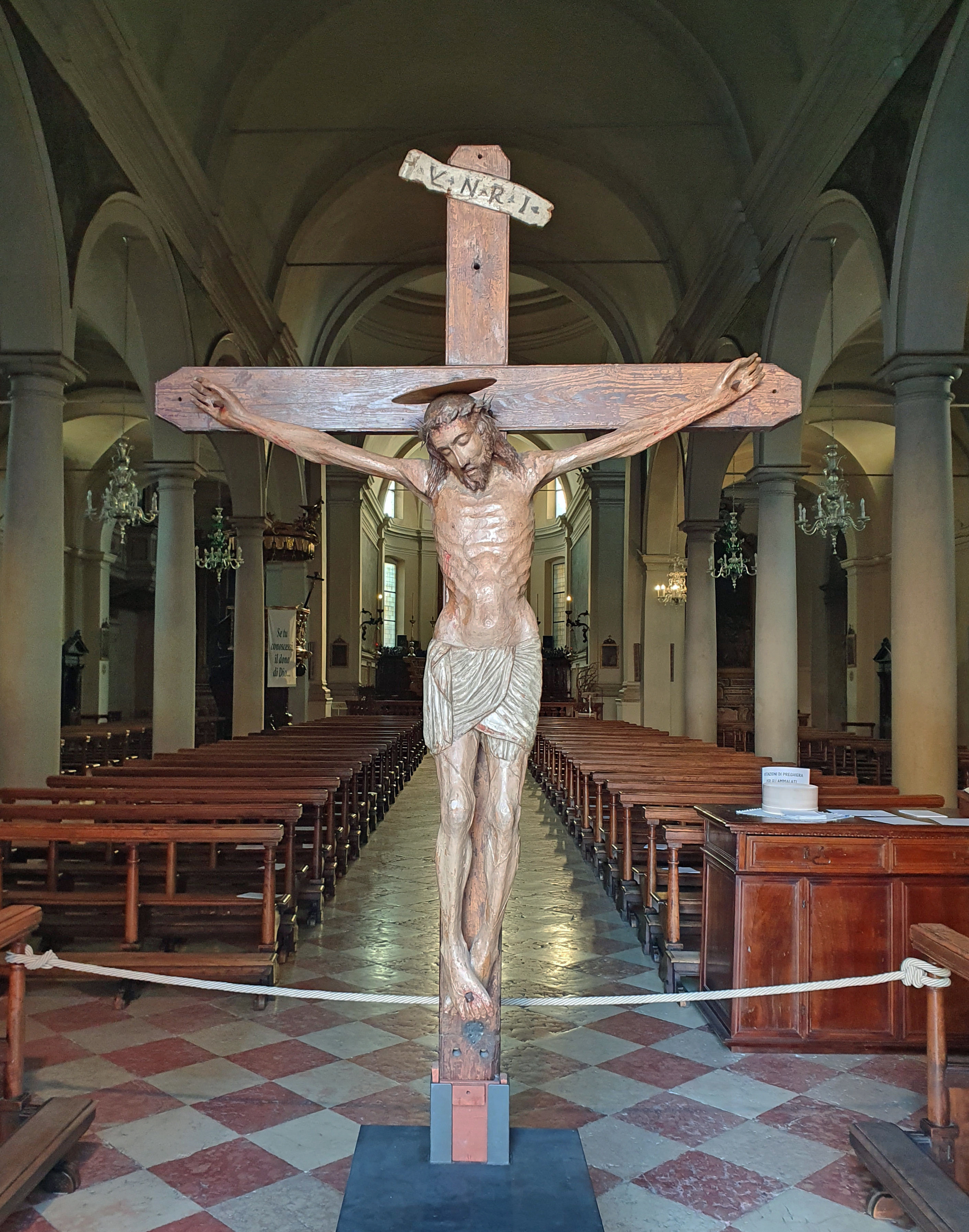
Miraculous crucifix

== Bibliography ==
=== In italian ===
- Berselli, Costante (1978). Castelgoffredo nella storia (in Italian). Mantua.
- Bonfiglio, Francesco (2005). Notizie storiche di Castelgoffredo (in Italian) (2 ed.). Mantua. ISBN 88-7495-163-9.
