= Castelvecchio =

Castelvecchio, an Italian word meaning "Old castle", may refer to:

== Places in Italy ==
=== Municipalities ===
- Castelvecchio Calvisio, in the Province of L'Aquila, Abruzzo
- Castelvecchio di Rocca Barbena, in the Province of Savona, Liguria
- Castelvecchio Subequo, in the Province of L'Aquila, Abruzzo

=== Civil parishes ===
- Castelvecchio (Carmignano), in the municipality of Carmignano (PO), Tuscany
- Castelvecchio (Monte Porzio), in the municipality of Monte Porzio (PU), Marche
- Castelvecchio (Pescia), in the municipality of Pescia (PT), Tuscany
- Castelvecchio (Preci), in the municipality of Preci (PG), Umbria
- Castelvecchio (San Gimignano), uninhabited, in the municipality of San Gimignano (SI), Tuscany
- Castelvecchio (Valdagno), in the municipality of Valdagno (VI), Veneto
- Castelvecchio Pascoli, in the municipality of Barga (LU), Tuscany

== Other ==
- Castelvecchio, the earliest part of Buonconsiglio Castle, Trento, Italy
- Castelvecchio (Siena), the ancient heart of the city of Siena, Italy
- Castelvecchio (Siusi), a castle in Siusi, Italy
- Castelvecchio (Castel Goffredo), the ancient heart of the city of Castel Goffredo, Italy
- Castelvecchio (Verona), a castle in Verona, Italy
- Castelvecchio Museum, a museum in Verona, Italy
- Kaštel Stari (it.: Castelvecchio), a village in the municipality of Kaštela, Split-Dalmatia County
