= Achille Nodari =

Italian engineer and entrepreneur

- Born: 1878; Castel Goffredo
- Died: 1946 (aged 67–68); Castel Goffredo
- Occupation(s): Engineer, Entrepreneur

Achille Nodari (Castel Goffredo, 1878 – Castel Goffredo, 1946) was an Italian engineer and entrepreneur, a pioneer in the industrialization of the area which would later become famous as the Castel Goffredo stocking district.

== Biography ==
He was a landowner and in 1925 he set up the first hosiery factory in Castel Goffredo, together with his brothers Delfino and Oreste Eoli. It was called NO.E.MI., which consisted of the initials of the founders' surnames with the addition of the initials of Milan, where the company's administrative headquarters were located.

The NO.E.MI Calzificio was regarded as "the cradle of the technical-entrepreneurial culture of Castel Goffredo".

In the 1950s the company, which ran into difficulty when fashion introduced cheaper socks without stripes, began to outsource some products, giving rise to an industrial offshoot: a laboratory in every home.

He held the position of mayor of Castel Goffredo for three terms: from 1923 to 1927, from 1928 to 1930 and from 1934 to 1938.

He died in Castel Goffredo at the age of 68.
