= Castelvecchio (Castel Goffredo) =

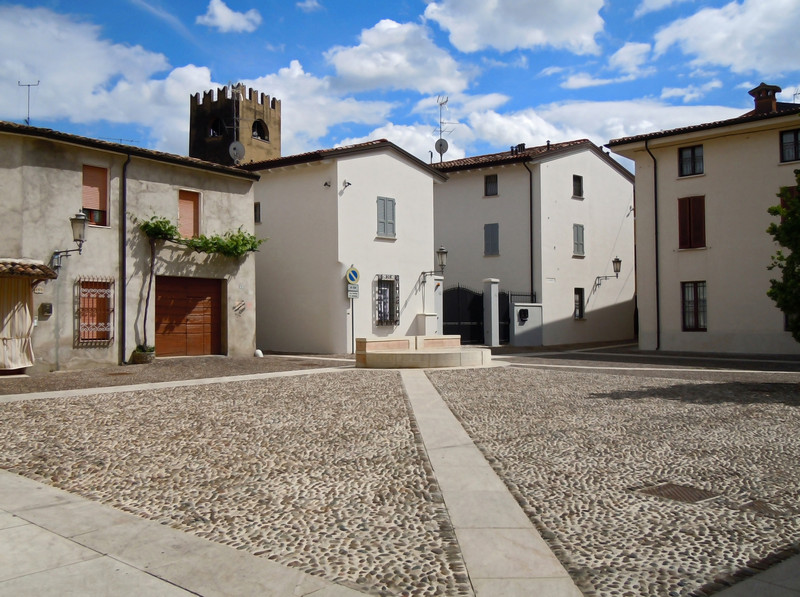
Castel Goffredo, Castelvecchio square

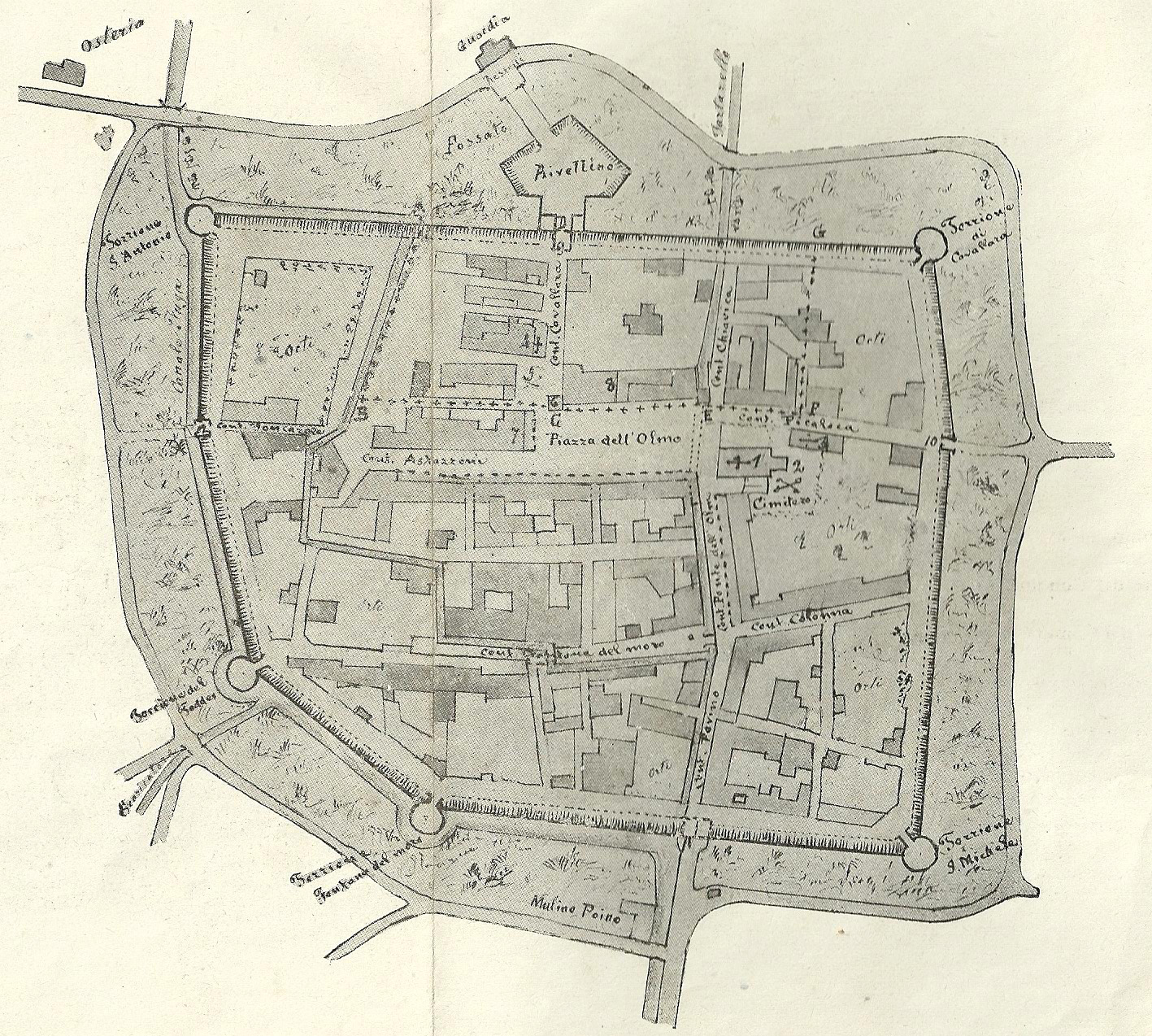
Map of castel goffredo in the 16th century. Castelvecchio is bordered on the north by small crosses

Castelvecchio (Castellum vetus) is the ancient fortified village of Castel Goffredo, in the province of Mantua Lombardy region in Italy, surrounded by walls and a moat. The boundaries currently correspond to the garden of the Palazzo Gonzaga-Acerbi to the north, to vicolo Remoto and vicolo Cannone to the east, to Piazza Mazzini to the south and to piazzetta Castelvecchio and vicolo Castelvecchio to the west.

== History ==
The first urban nucleus of Castel Goffredo, surrounded by walls and moat, was formed within the ruins of the Roman castrum and will be called Castellum vetus, or "Castelvecchio".

Built between 900 and 1000, of the village is mentioned in a document dated June 12, 1480 in which Ludovico Gonzaga, bishop of Mantua and lord of Castel Goffredo, stipulated agreements with the municipality on the possession of some lands of the place. In the deed of submission of the city to the Gonzaga of Mantua dated 1337 to a deed by the notary De Gandulfis, the town is mentioned with the name of "castle of the lands of Castro Guyfredo".

An alley of "Castelvecchio" was named after Charles V, Holy Roman Emperor, in memory of his visit of June 28, 1543 to the Marquis Aloisio Gonzaga.

The ancient village also included:

- the medieval castle, now disappeared;
- the Church of Santa Maria del Consorzio, the oldest in the city, demolished in 1986, of which the fifteenth-century bell tower and the frescoed apse are still preserved;
- the Casa Prignaca;
- the Civic Tower, 27 meters high, which served as a gateway (called porta castelli veteri) and closed access to Castelvecchio;
- the Palazzo Gonzaga-Acerbi;
- Piazza Gonzaga
- the ancient walls.

== See also ==
- History of Castel Goffredo
- Castel Goffredo Town Hall

== Gallery ==
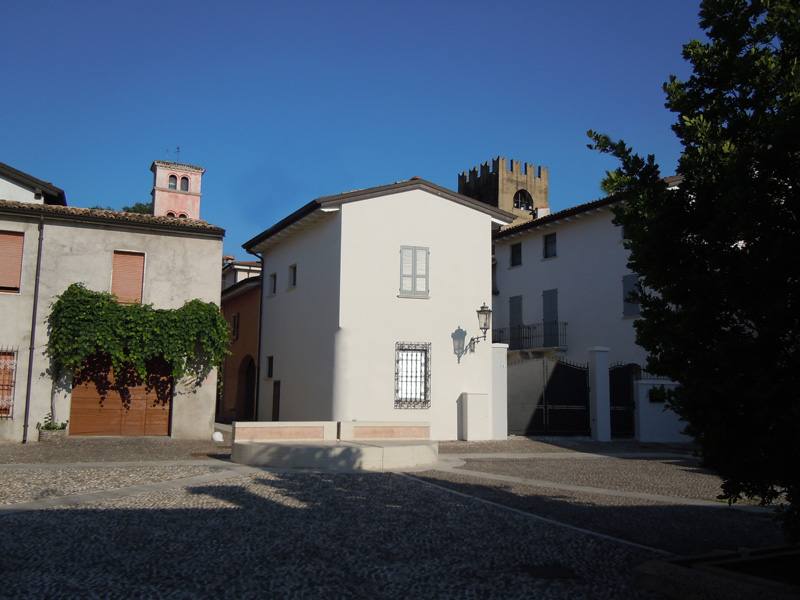
Castelvecchio square

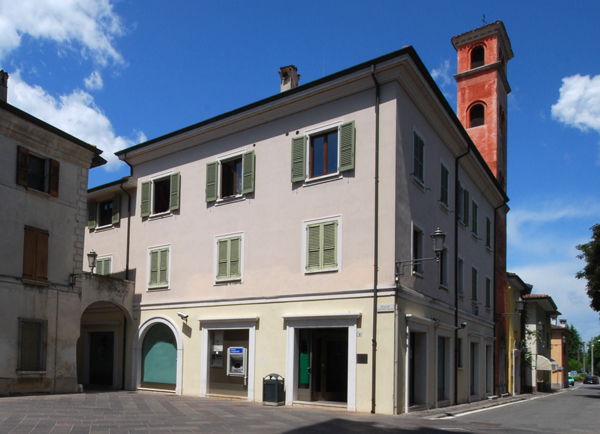
Piazza Gonzaga

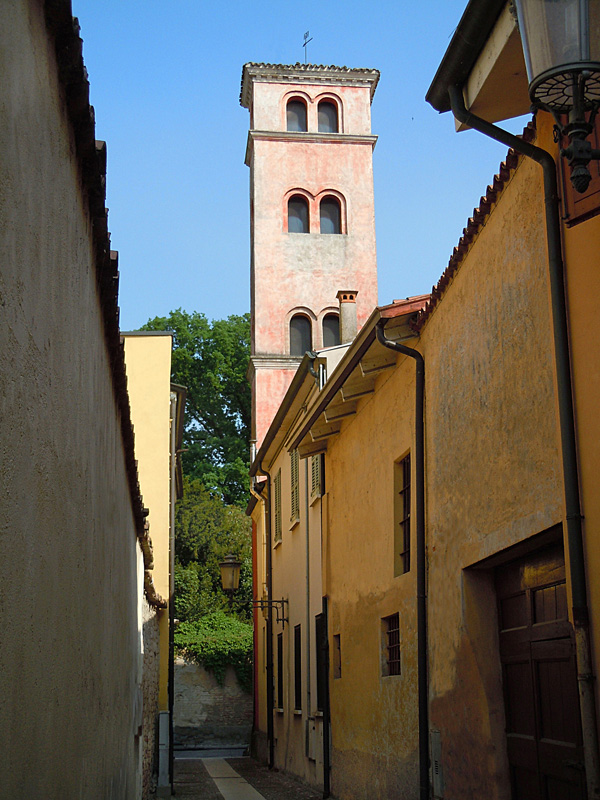
Charles V alley

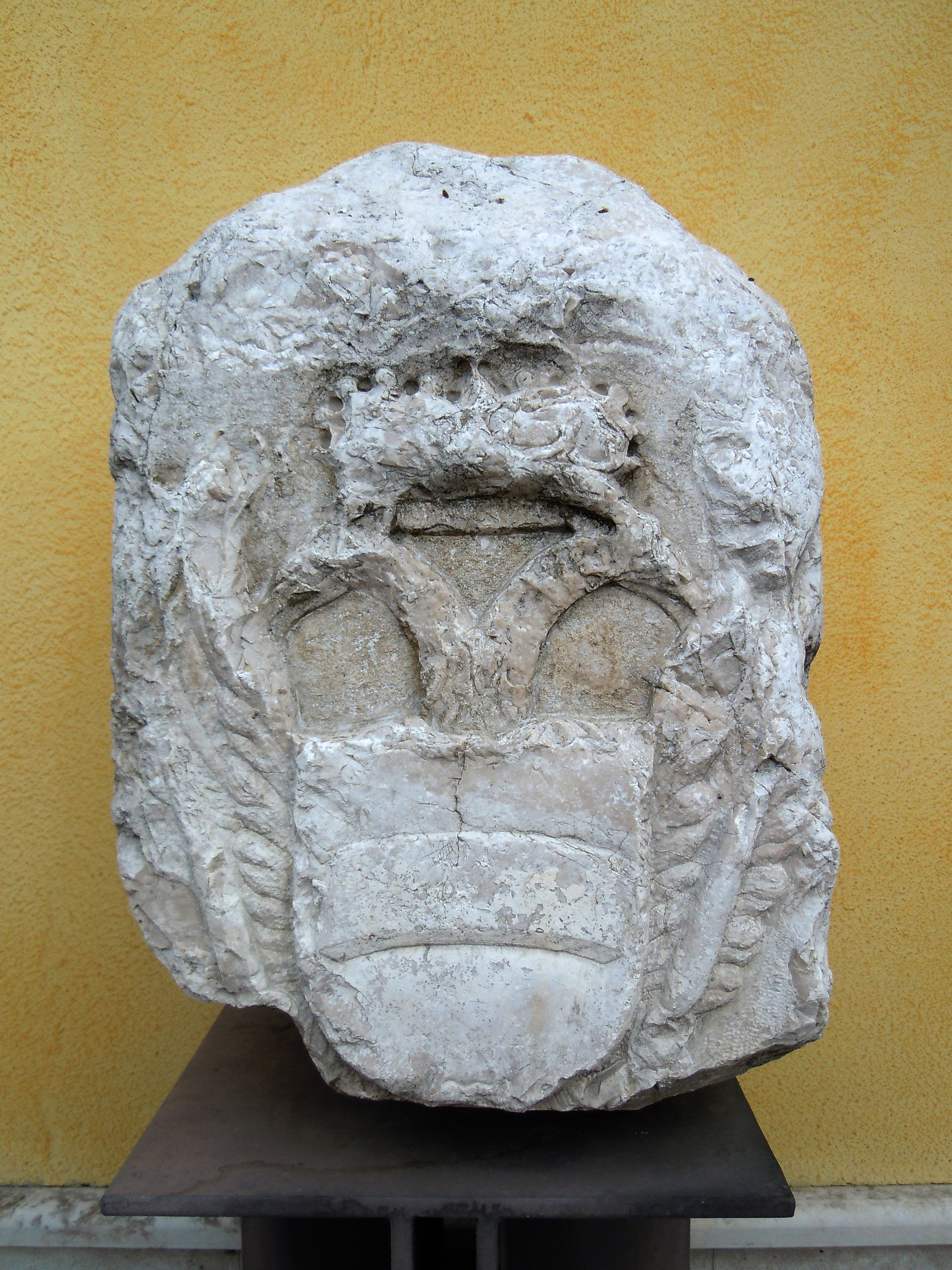
1756 boundary marker

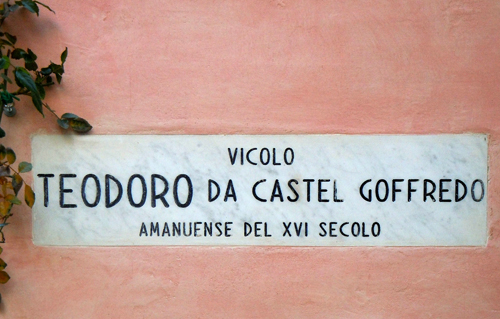
Teodoro da Castel Goffredo alley

== Bibliography ==
=== In italian ===
- Costante Berselli, Castelgoffredo nella storia, Mantua, 1978.
- Francesco Bonfiglio, Notizie storiche di Castelgoffredo, 1ª ed., Brescia, 1922.
- Francesco Bonfiglio, Notizie storiche di Castelgoffredo, 2ª ed., Mantova, 2005.
- Enzo Boriani,Castelli e torri dei Gonzaga nel territorio mantovano, Brescia, 1969.
- Leandro Zoppè, Itinerari gonzagheschi, Milan, 1988, ISBN 88-85462-10-3.
- Massimo Marocchi, I Gonzaga di Castiglione delle Stiviere. Vicende pubbliche e private del casato di San Luigi, Verona, 1990.
