= Civic Tower (Castel Goffredo) =

Historic structure in Mantua, Italy

Coordinates: 45.298248°N 10.474776°E

- Torre di Castelvecchio
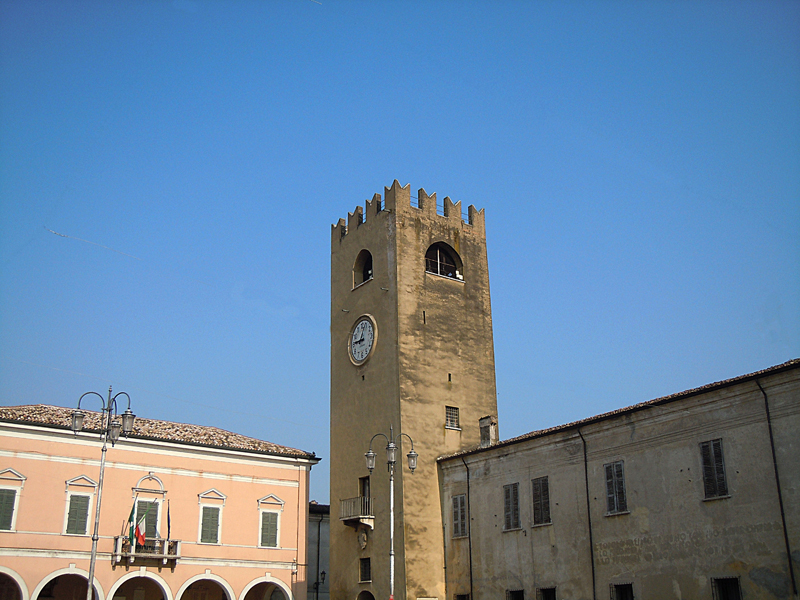
- Interactive map of the Civic Tower area

General information
- Location: Piazza Mazzini, Castel Goffredo, Italy
- Construction started: 13th century

Height
- Height: 27 metres (89 ft)

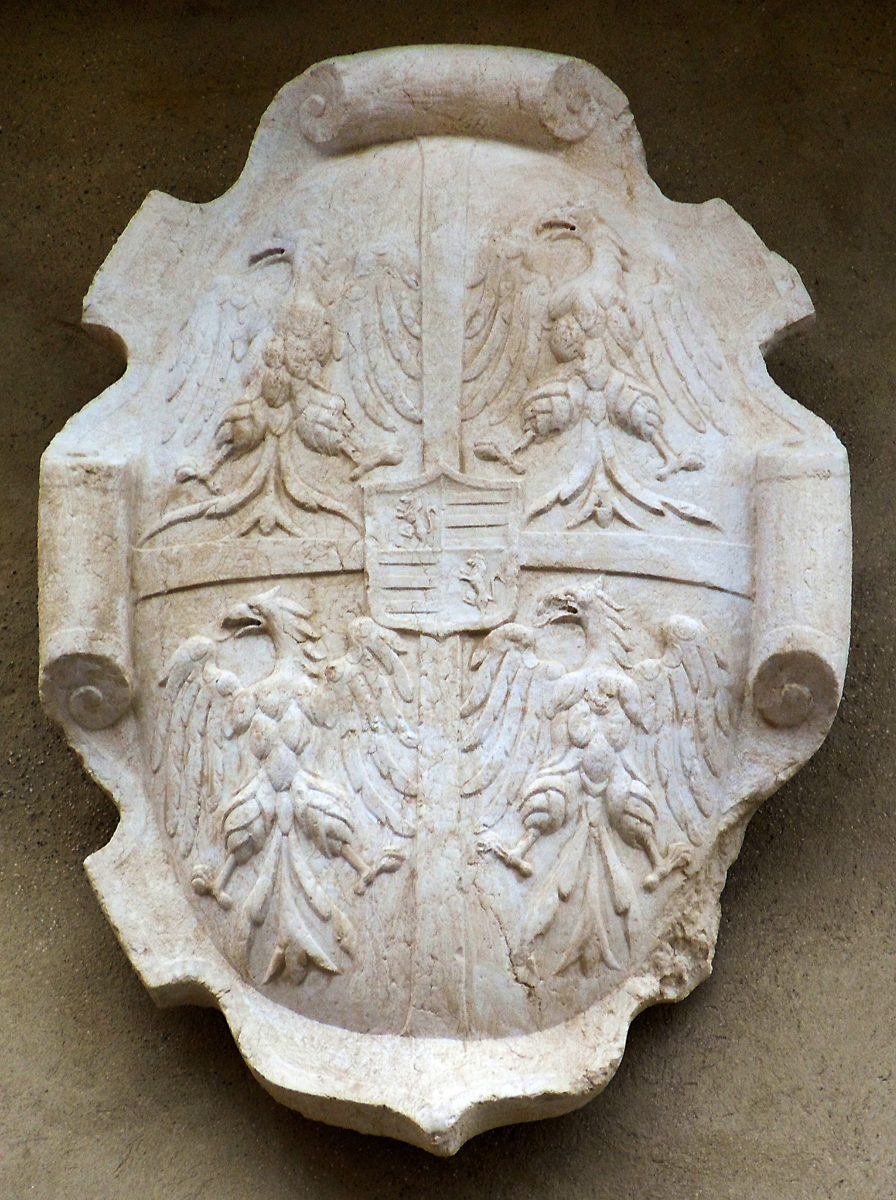
Coat of arms with the Gonzaga weapon on the Civic Tower (16th century).

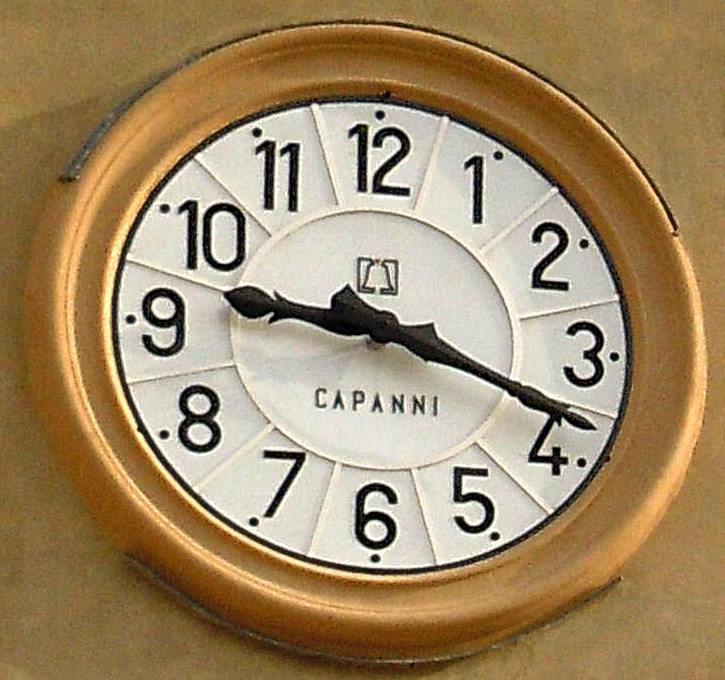
Clock of the civic tower (1438).

The Civic Tower (Italian: Torre Civica) (or Clock Tower, Torre di Castelvecchio) is a historic building in the town of Castel Goffredo, in the province of Mantua, Italy.

The structure is located in Piazza Mazzini, in the historic city center, or in the part that bordered the ancient fortress of Castelvecchio (castellum vetus). On its right side was the Palazzo del Vicario, now incorporated into the Palazzo Gonzaga-Acerbi. Located on the left side of the Palazzo Gonzaga-Acerbi and the Palazzo della Ragione, it has witnessed for centuries the political center of the city and is popularly considered the symbol of Castel Goffredo.

== History ==
Belonging to the first city walls of the city, it enclosed the medieval village of Castelvecchio in the southern part. Its foundation, perhaps on a pre-existing structure and with walls at the base of 1.30 meters thick, dates back to the 13th century and the public clock has been there since 1438. The civic tower was constructed in 1492, before the elevation. On the right is the Palazzo del Vicario. The Aloysian epigraph on the civic tower (16th century) states: NE' SUPERBIA IN LA PROSPERA NE VILTA' IN LA ADVERSA and ALOYSIVS RODVLPHI FILIVS. The marble coat of arms with the Gonzaga weapon is affixed to the passing arch of the tower, once equipped with a gate, and two inscriptions are placed on the sides by Aloisio Gonzaga in the first half of the sixteenth century.

== Structure ==
Initially covered by a roof and about 20 meters high, it underwent expansion works that allowed it to reach the current 27 meters in height. It was equipped with an external staircase, on the east side, which connected the square with the interior of the tower, in which justice was administered from the fifteenth century and where there was also a torture chamber.

In 1492 it was raised with a new belfry which still hosts the concert of eight bells, some of which date back to the 16th century, of the Prepositural Church of Sant'Erasmo.

In 1925 the roof was removed and the Ghibelline battlements were built.

=== The Leaning Tower ===
The tower has for centuries shown a marked deviation from verticality, with out-of-plumb markings towards Piazza Mazzini. For this reason, in 2006, it was subjected to important static checks, since the out of plumb has increased in the last decades.

== Bibliography ==
- (in Italian) Costante Berselli, Castelgoffredo nella storia, Mantova, 1978.
- (in Italian) Francesco Bonfiglio, Notizie storiche di Castelgoffredo, 2ª ed., Mantova, 2005.
- (in Italian) Carlo Gozzi, Raccolta di documenti per la storia patria od Effemeridi storiche patrie, Tomo II, Mantova, 2003.
- (in Italian) Touring Club Italiano, Lombardia, Milano, 1970.
