= Torrazzo of Castel Goffredo =

Historic structure

Coordinates: 45°17′53″N 10°28′32″E

- Torrione
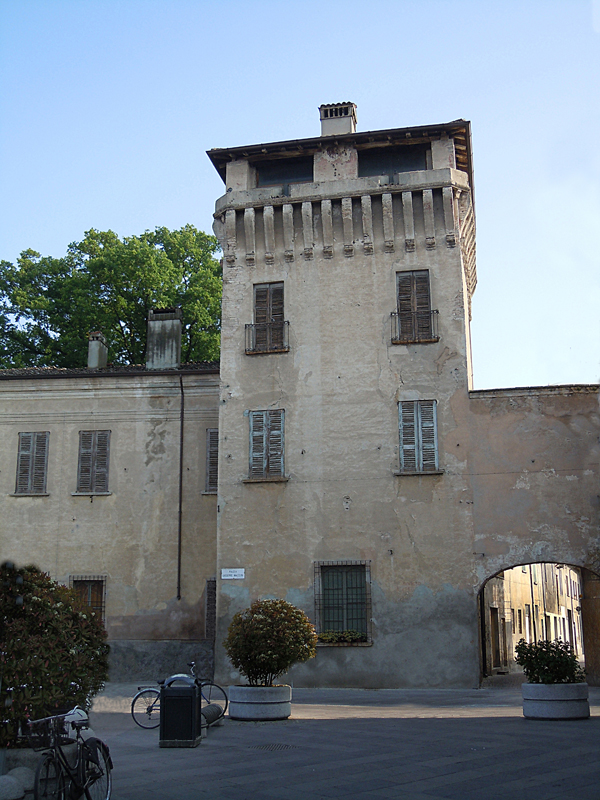
- Interactive map of the Torrazzo of Castel Goffredo area
- Alternative names: Torricello

General information
- Location: Piazza Mazzini, Castel Goffredo, Italy
- Construction started: 14th century

Height
- Height: 23 metres (75 ft)

The Torrazzo is a historic building in Castel Goffredo, in the province of Mantua.

== History and description ==
Located in the south-eastern corner of Palazzo Gonzaga-Acerbi, to which it belongs and whose history it follows, in the central Piazza Mazzini, it is a medieval building with a cantilevered crown supported by corbels, probably erected in the second half of the 14th century for defensive purposes and used as a residence for the vicar representing the Gonzaga family of Mantua, to whom the Municipality of Castel Goffredo had to provide accommodation and contribute to the salary. The first vicar to occupy the structure was Ambrogio de Ferrari in 1379 which was followed by thirteen others. The torture chamber was housed on the ground floor of the building.

Until 1480 it belonged to the Municipality together with the Palazzo del Vicario, who gave it to the bishop of Mantua Ludovico Gonzaga (1460-1511) when he became marquis of Castel Goffredo, perhaps with the intention, together with the other wing of the palace, of making it his residence.

An anonymous seventeenth-century manuscript reports that the Torrazzo (also known as "Torricello" or "Torricella") was the seat of the pawnshop of the Jews, called in 1588 from Mantua by the Marquis Alfonso Gonzaga. Saint Aloysius Gonzaga also stayed in the Torrazzo.

Elena Aliprandi and her daughter Cinzia Gonzaga were held prisoner in the rooms of the Torrazzo when a popular uprising of the "Magnificent Community" of the castle led to the death of her husband, the Marquis Rodolfo Gonzaga (1569-1593) on 3 January 1593.

It was externally renovated in the eighteenth century when the five windows overlooking the square were opened.

== Bibliography ==
- (in Italian) Antonino Bertolotti, I comuni e le parrocchie della provincia mantovana, Mantova, 1893.
- (in Italian) Costante Berselli, Castelgoffredo nella storia, Mantova, 1978.
- (in Italian) Francesco Bonfiglio, Notizie storiche di Castelgoffredo, 2ª ed., Mantova, 2005.
- (in Italian) Carlo Gozzi, Raccolta di documenti per la storia patria od Effemeridi storiche patrie, Tomo II, Mantova, 2003.
- (in Italian) Touring Club Italiano, Lombardia, Milano, 1970.
