= Acerbo =

Acèrbo or Acerbo is an Italian surname and may refer to:

- Acerbo Morena (died 1167), Italian chronicler
- Giacomo Acerbo, Italian economist and Fascist politician, author of the Acerbo Law
- Maurizio Acerbo (born 1965), Italian politician and former Secretary of the Communist Refoundation Party
- Sandro Acerbo (born 1955), Italian voice actor

== Other ==
- Coppa Acerbo, an Italian automobile race
- Acerbo Law, an Italian electoral law

== See also ==
- Acerbi, a related surname
