= Piazza Mazzini, Castel Goffredo =

Piazza Mazzini
- Public square
- {{{other_names}}}
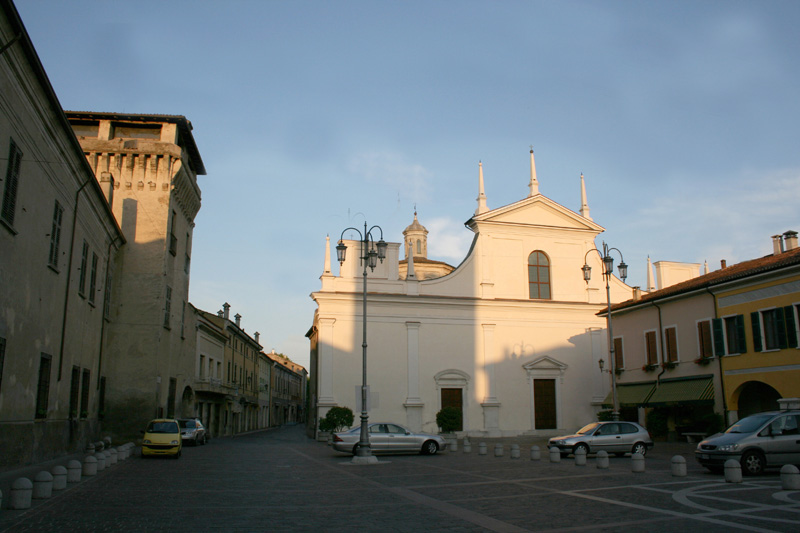
- Provostorial church of Sant'Erasmo
- Opened: 14th century
- Surface: stone
- Dedicated to: Giuseppe Mazzini
- Location: Castel Goffredo, Italy
- Interactive map of Piazza Mazzini

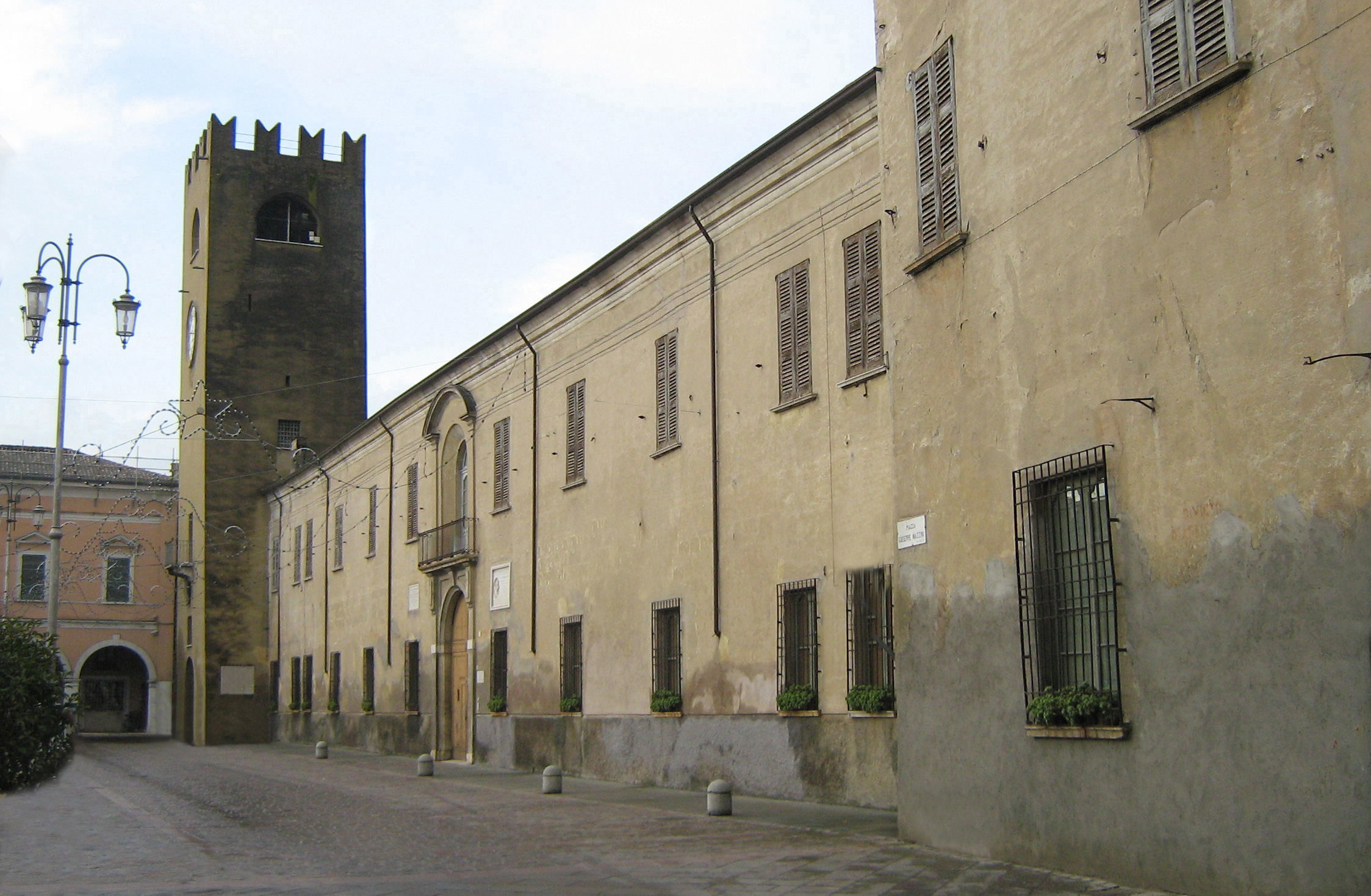
Palazzo Gonzaga-Acerbi

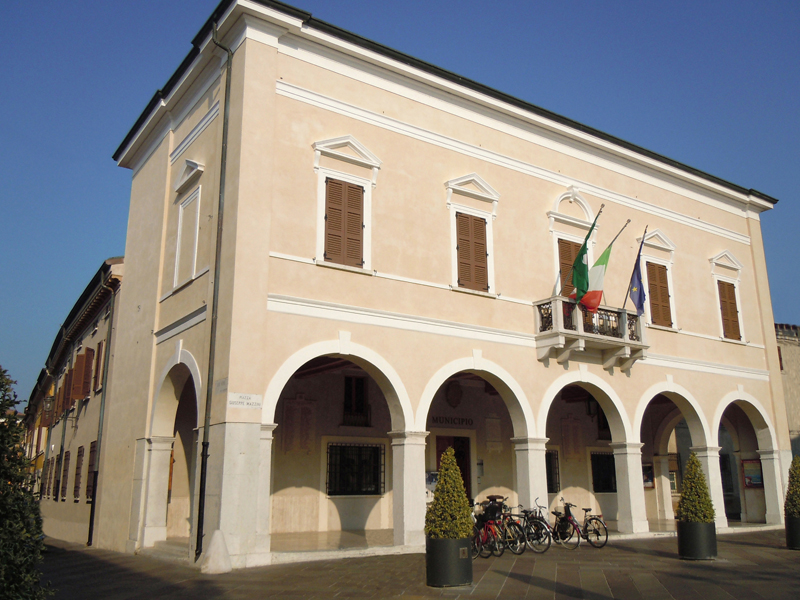
Castel Goffredo Town Hall

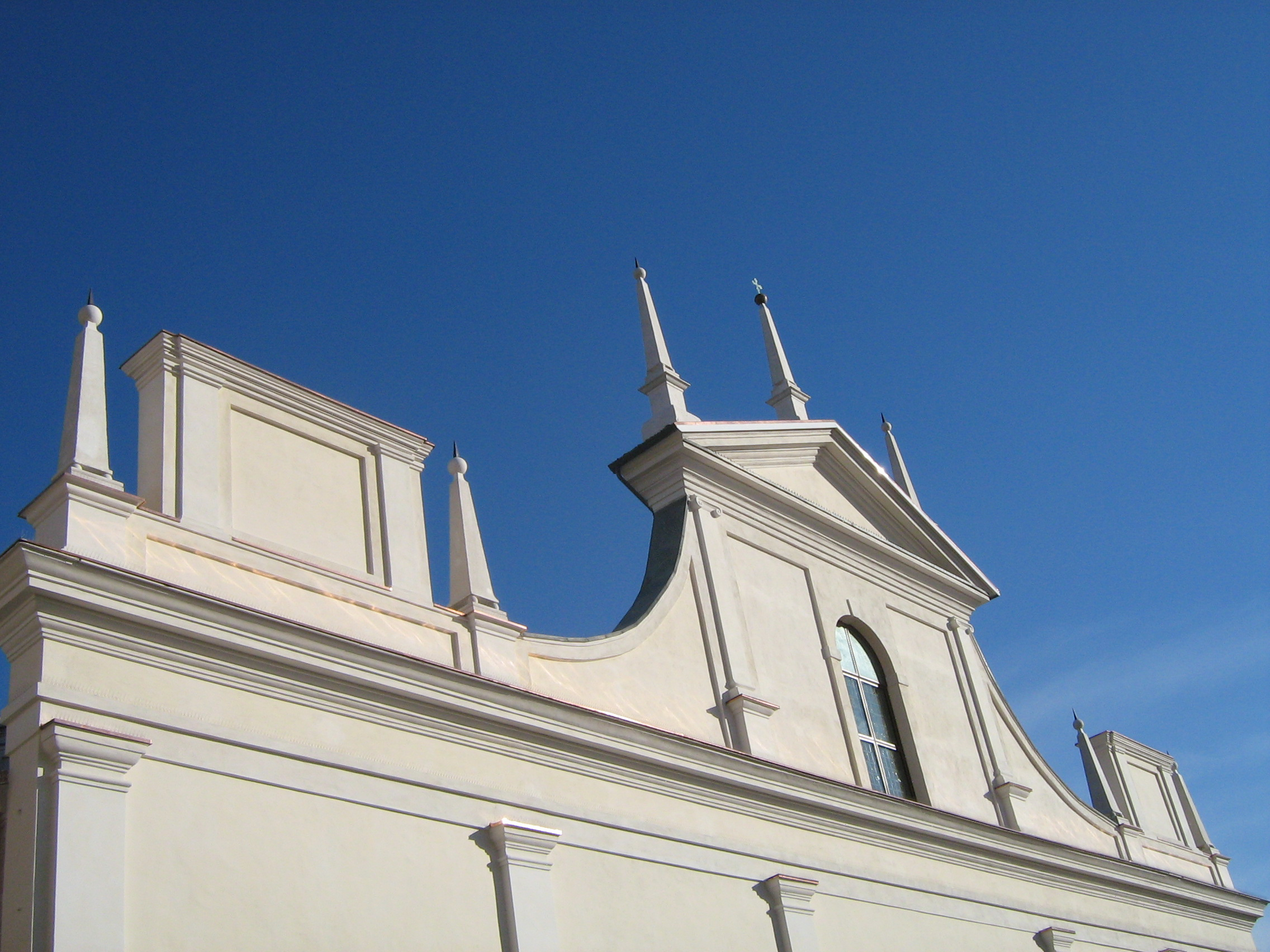
Sant'Erasmo church

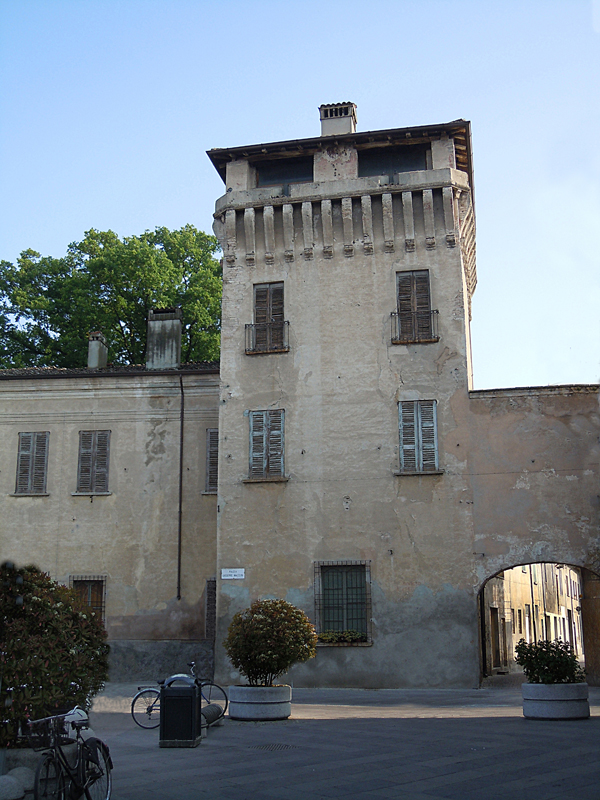
Torrazzo

Piazza Mazzini (in Italian: Mazzini Square) is a public square in the center of Castel Goffredo, region of Lombardy, Italy.

== History ==
It represents the heart of the city, a political, religious and commercial center and the most significant buildings overlook it:

- Civic Tower, the symbol of Castel Goffredo;
- Palazzo Gonzaga-Acerbi, consisting of the former Palazzo del Vicario with the civic tower and the Torrazzo, to the north;
- Torrazzo, to the north;
- Provostorial church of Sant'Erasmo, in the east;
- Palazzo Riva and the arcades with shops of merchants, to the south;
- Castel Goffredo Town Hall, municipal building, to the west.

Its planimetric layout has remained almost unchanged through the centuries: the square is characterized by a rectangular plan, presumably corresponding to the ancient Roman Forum.

Existing already at the beginning of the fourteenth century, the square was crossed by the Tartarello canal, then discovered, which also fed the defense moat in front of the palace of the lords of Castel Goffredo. Redesigned at the beginning of the sixteenth century during the marquisate of Aloisio Gonzaga, it is a particularly suggestive and spectacular place and is often chosen to host cultural events, concerts and public events, such as the traditional carnival of Castel Goffredo with the election of King Gnocco (in Italian: Re Gnocco).

It has always been the center of the life of the city: from 1457 fairs were held there, parties for the arrival of the bishops and even the major personalities who visited Castel Goffredo have always passed by this square: by Charles V, Holy Roman Emperor June 28, 1543, to Charles Borromeo in 1580, to Victor Emmanuel II, the future king of Italy in May 1848, to Giuseppe Garibaldi, on 27-28-29 April 1862.

On 3 January 1593, Rodolfo Gonzaga (1569-1593), marquis of Castel Goffredo, was assassinated on the main door of the church of Sant'Erasmo, on his way to mass accompanied by his wife Elena Aliprandi and daughter Cinzia Gonzaga.

In history it has undergone several changes of denomination: piazza del Ponte dell'Olmo (Platea Pontis Ulmi), then piazza d'Armi, piazza Umberto I and then piazza Mazzini.

At certain times of the year the Thursday street market is held inside, established by a decree of 1 July 1457 by the marquis Alessandro Gonzaga.

On the side of the arcades is the nineteenth-century marble fountain, once used for drinking purposes.

== Bibliography ==
- (in Italian) Costante Berselli, Castelgoffredo nella storia, Mantova, 1978.
- (in Italian) Francesco Bonfiglio, Notizie storiche di Castelgoffredo, 2ª ed., Mantova, 2005, ISBN 88-7495-163-9.
- (in Italian) Carlo Gozzi, Raccolta di documenti per la storia patria od Effemeridi storiche patrie, Tomo II, Mantova, 2003, ISBN 88-7495-059-4.
