= Bernardino Facciotto =

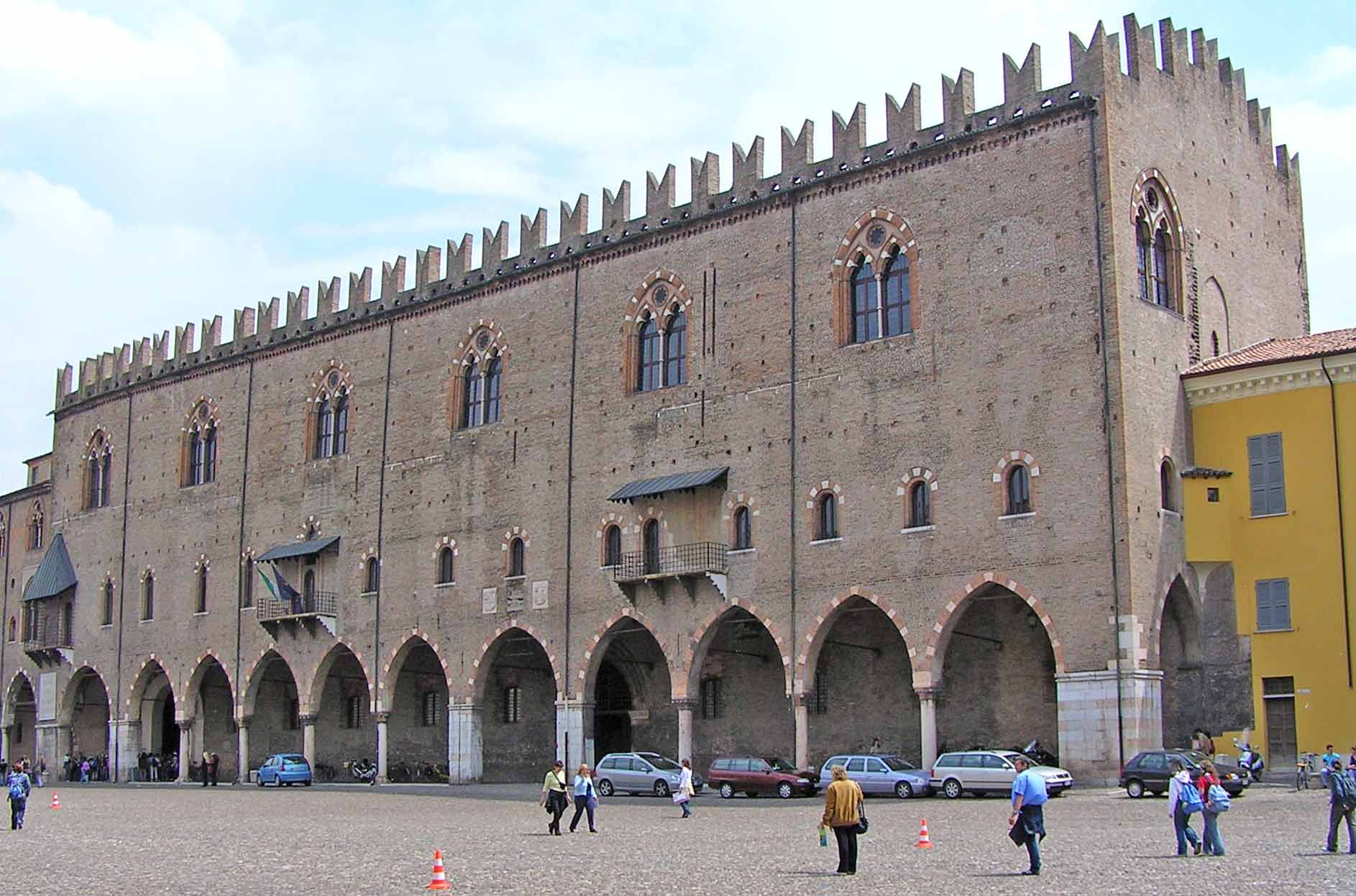
Mantua, Ducal Palace

Bernardino Facciotto (1540–1598) was an Italian military and civil architect who was born and died in Casale Monferrato.

== Biography ==
Born in Casale Monferrato in 1540, he was a pupil of Francesco Paciotto. In 1564 he collaborated with him in works in the city of Turin. In 1576, requested by Guglielmo Gonzaga, Duke of Mantua, he was called for the construction of the city of Alba.

Then he moved to Mantua and, in 1576 at the death of the architect Giovanni Battista Bertani, he received orders to continue the reconstruction of the Ducal Palace which he completed with gardens, squares, porches, galleries, courtyards and exedrals, and gave it the look of a ducal residence. Between 1580 and 1582, he made the "patio of the eight faces", (Il cortile delle Otto Facce).

Facciotto's work for the court of the Gonzaga also extended outside this city. In Motteggiana in 1582, he completely renovated the Ghirardina Court, initiated by Luca Fancelli around 1470. In 1583, he made an important work in the palace Gazzuolo and the following year he extended the residence of Goito, where Guglielmo retired to pray.

In 1587, he worked in the fortress of Cavriana, in Villimpenta's "Villa Zani" which in the same year became the property of Gonzaga and had been projected in 1530 by Giulio Romano.

On Guglielmo's death, Facciotto worked for his successor Count Vincenzo I of Gonzaga at the family mausoleum in the church of San Francesco in Mantua.

In 1588, he was invited to Castel Goffredo, home of Marquis Alfonso Gonzaga, for the reconstruction of the church of San Erasmo, where the dome had fallen.

While he was busy in working at the fortifications of Casale Monferrato he died in 1598.

Facciotto had two sons who continued his work:

- Girolamo (1565-1648 circa)
- Giovan Domenico
