= Acerbi =

Acèrbi
- Language: Italian

Origin
- Languages: Italian, Latin
- Origin: From Italian word acèrbo, itself from Latin acerbus
- Meaning: Immature
- Region of origin: Northern Italy

Other names
- Variant form: Acerbo
- Derivatives: Acerbóni; Accerbóni

Acèrbi or Acerbi is an Italian surname. Notable people with the surname include:

- Angelo Acerbi (born 1925), Italian Roman Catholic cardinal
- Francesco Acerbi (born 1988), Italian footballer
- Giovanni Acerbi (1825–1869), Italian soldier and politician
- Giuseppe Acerbi (1773–1846), Italian naturalist, explorer and composer
- Marco Acerbi (1949–1989), Italian hurdler
- Mario Acerbi (1913–2010), Italian professional football player
- Mario Acerbi (painter) (1887–1982), Italian painter

== See also ==
- Italian destroyer Giovanni Acerbi, an Italian warship
- Acerbis, Italian company
- Paolo Acerbis (b. 1981), Italian professional football player
