= Acquafredda =

- Comune
- Comune di Acquafredda
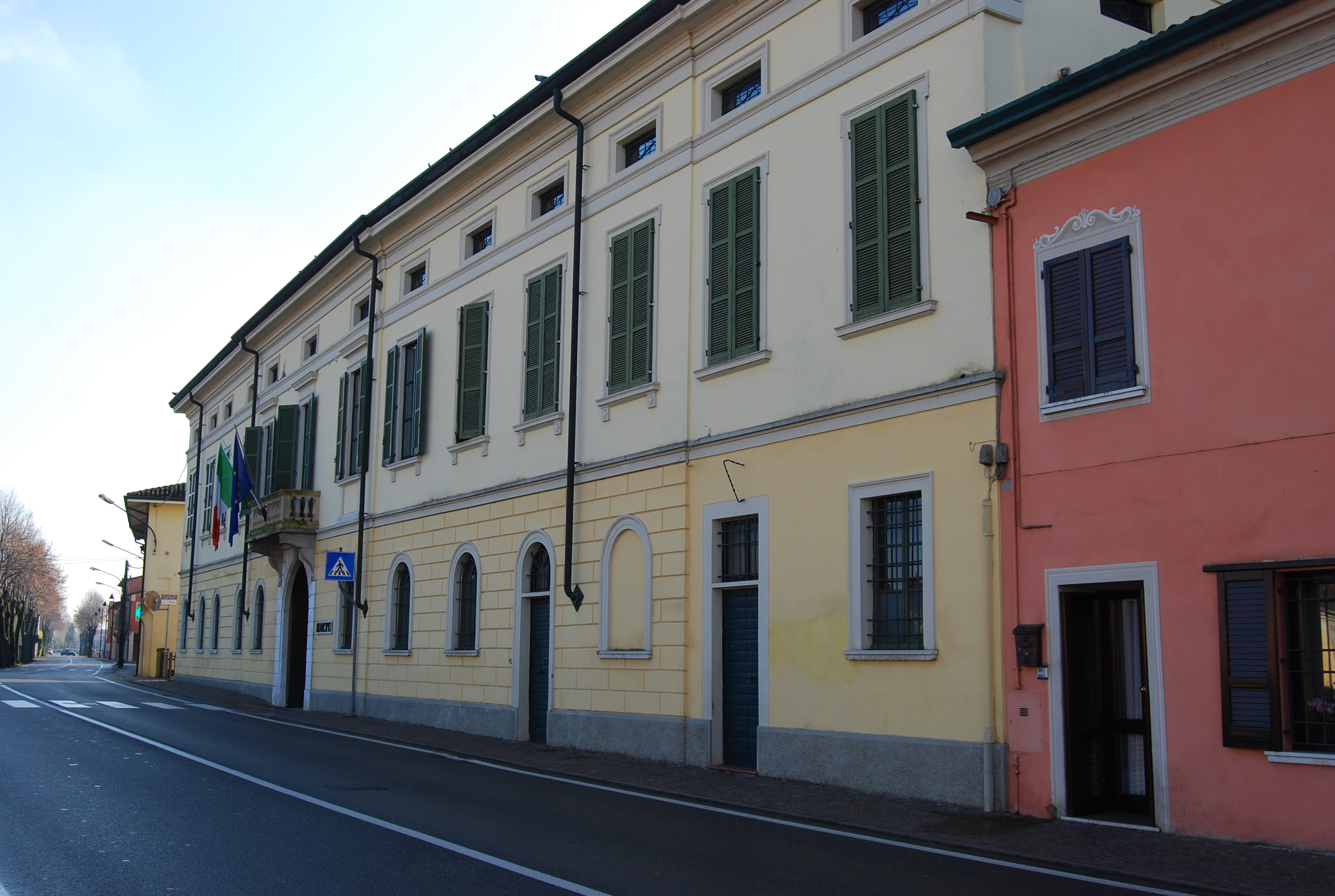
- View of Acquafredda

- Location of Acquafredda in Italy Acquafredda (Lombardy)
- Coordinates: 45°18′N 10°25′E
- Country: Italy
- Region: Lombardy
- Province: Brescia (BS)

Government
  - Mayor: Maurizio Donini

Area
  - Total: 9.55 km^{2} (3.69 sq mi)
- Elevation: 56 m (184 ft)

Population (30 November 2017)
  - Total: 1,564
  - Density: 164/km^{2} (424/sq mi)
- Demonym: Acquafreddesi
- Time zone: UTC+1 (CET)
  - Summer (DST): UTC+2 (CEST)
- Postal code: 25010
- Dialing code: 030
- Website: Official website

Acquafredda (Brescian: Aquafrèda) is a town and comune in the province of Brescia, in Lombardy, northern Italy.
