= Palazzo Gonzaga-Acerbi =

Coordinates: 45.2982°N 10.4751°E

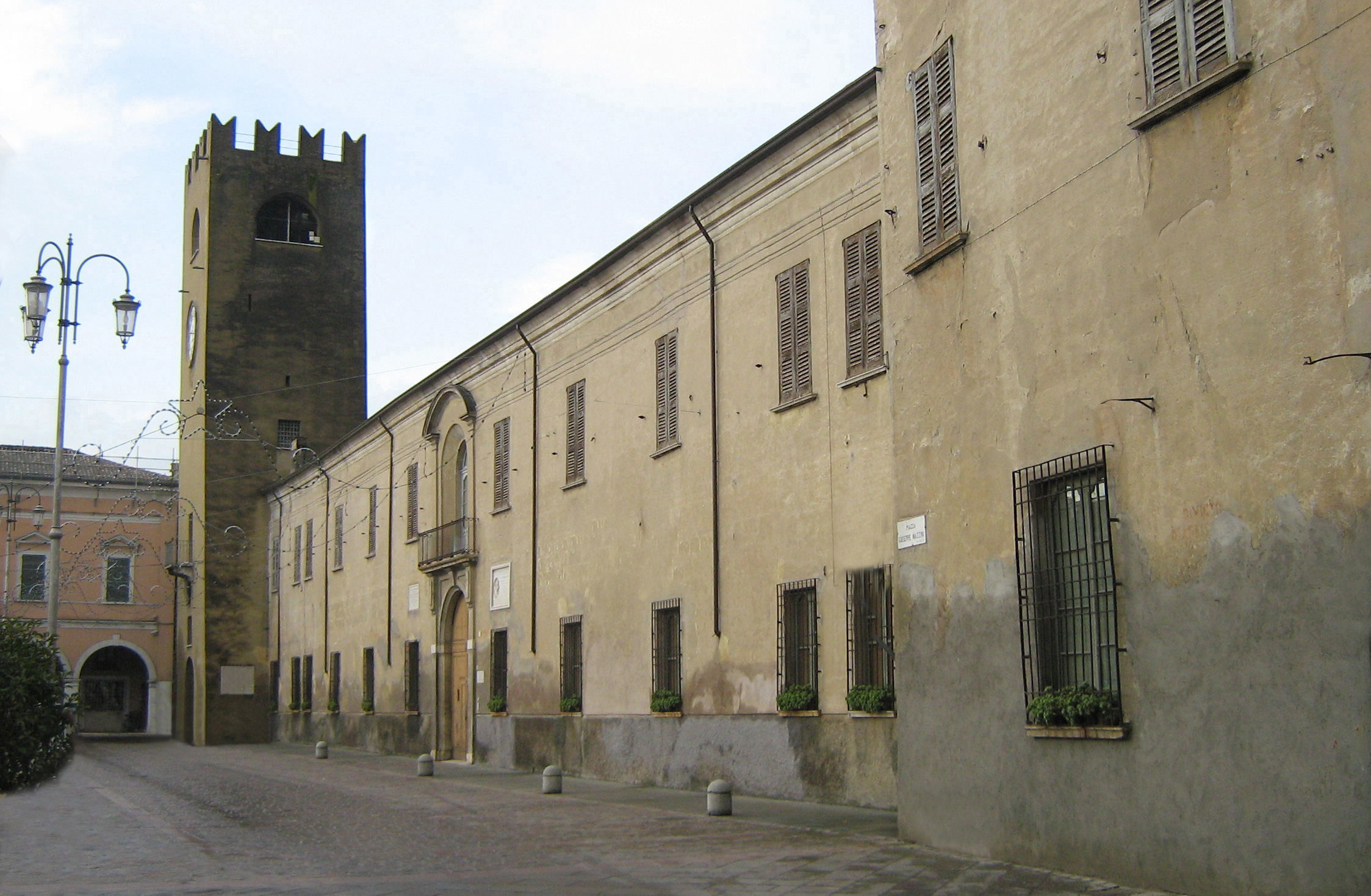
- Interactive map of the Palazzo Gonzaga-Acerbi area

General information
- Location: Castel Goffredo, Italy
- Construction started: 15th century

Palazzo Gonzaga-Acerbi is a historic palace in Castel Goffredo in the Province of Mantua in Italy.

It forms the whole north front of Piazza Mazzini in the city centre.

The original construction of a castle residence, made up of two distinct buildings not connected to each other, subject to various additions and modifications, is set between the Civic Tower to the west and the Torrazzo to the east and dates back to about 1350. It was owned by the municipality (domus comunis), which carried out expansion and refurbishment works and was the seat of the offices of the Gonzaga vicar, who instead lived in the Torrazzo annex, communicating with the palace.

It was used by Aloisio Gonzaga to host his court from 1511 to 1549 and to host a visit Charles V, Holy Roman Emperor in 1543. After the aggregation to the Duchy of Mantua in 1603, no Gonzaga lived in the palace anymore. After the fall of the Gonzaga dynasty, from 1707 it passed under the Austrian government. It remained uninhabited and unusable for a long time until 1756, when the Austrian state property sold it to the municipality of Castel Goffredo. The municipality on 13 April 1776 gave it to Colonel Giacomo Acerbi, landowner, who modified the original medieval appearance of the building. It was the birthplace of Giovanni Acerbi, who on 27–29 April 1862 used it to host Garibaldi.

Inside there is a loggia supported by marble columns with finely frescoed grotesque faces (perhaps the school of Giulio Romano). A staircase, with a frescoed vault, leads to the main floor. Aloisio Gonzaga is also responsible for the creation of the internal garden, now full of centuries-old trees, the white marble fountain and the pergola of precious grapes.

== Bibliography ==
- (in Italian) Costante Berselli, Castelgoffredo nella storia, Mantova, 1978.
- (in Italian) Francesco Bonfiglio, Notizie storiche di Castelgoffredo, 2ª ed., Mantova, 2005, ISBN 88-7495-163-9.
- (in Italian) Carlo Gozzi, Raccolta di documenti per la storia patria od Effemeridi storiche patrie, Tomo II, Mantova, 2003, ISBN 88-7495-059-4.
