= Castel Goffredo Town Hall =

Coordinates: 45.298097°N 10.474628°E

- Palazzo municipale di Castel Goffredo
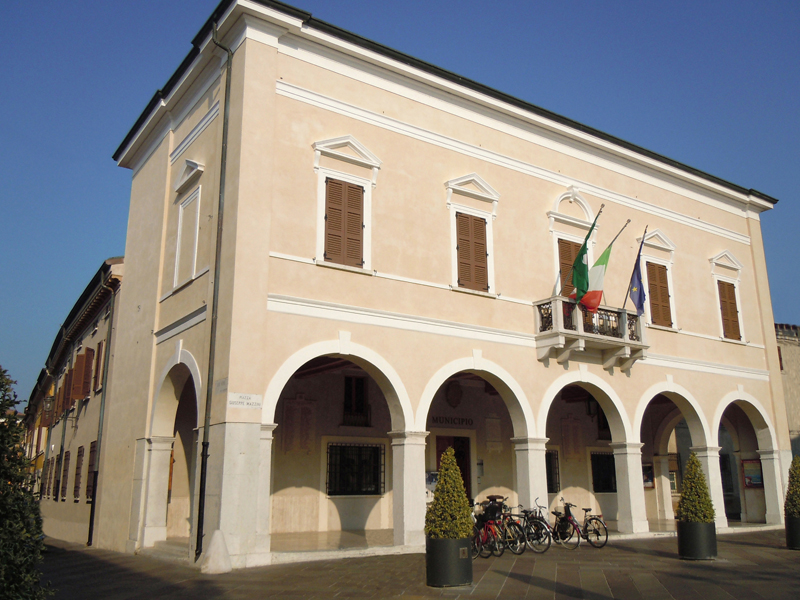
- Interactive map of the Castel Goffredo Town Hall area

General information
- Type: City hall
- Architectural style: Neoclassical architecture
- Location: piazza Giuseppe Mazzini, 1, Castel Goffredo, Province of Mantua, Italy
- Construction started: 14th century
- Completed: 15th century
- Owner: Municipality of Castel Goffredo

Castel Goffredo Town Hall (also called Palazzo della Ragione) and Loggia della Magnifica Comunità are located in Piazza Mazzini in Castel Goffredo, in the Province of Mantua (Italy). It is the seat of the municipality.

== History ==
The ancient communal building (domus Comunis) (or Palazzo del Vicario) was placed on the right side of the civic tower in the ancient "Piazza del Ponte dell'Olmo"; appears to have been present since 1337, when Castel Goffredo, with a public act by the notary Giacomino Gandolfi, placed himself under the protection of Ludovico I Gonzaga, the first capitano del popolo of Mantua.

This building was ceded in 1480, passing into property to Ludovico Gonzaga (1460-1511), bishop of Mantua and marquis of Castel Goffredo, who intended to make it his residence. It is therefore possible to hypothesize that the current structure was built after the aforementioned sale. Every year the general neighborhood was gathered in the house which, composed of all the heads of the family, appointed the Council to take care of public service assignments. [3]

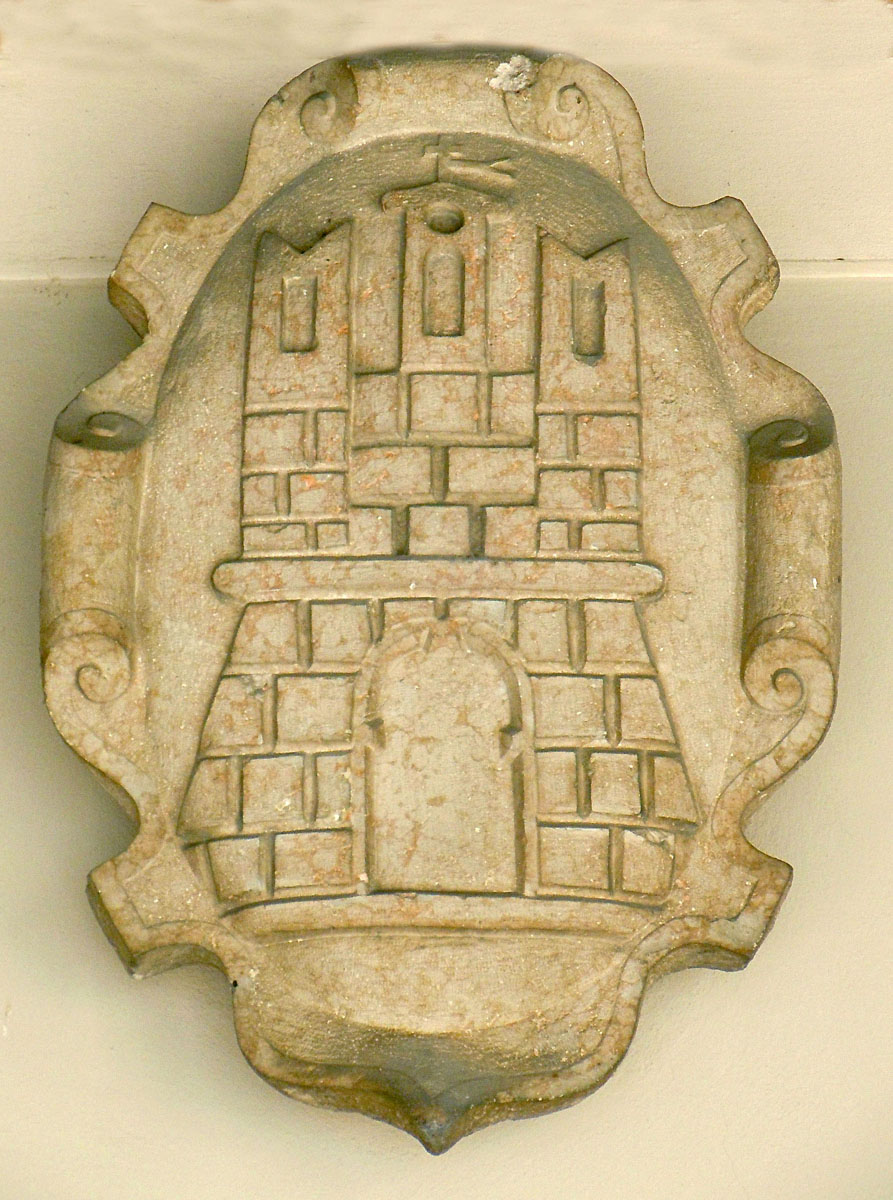
Coat of arms of the municipality

== Description ==
The oldest, main facade overlooking piazza Mazzini is in neoclassical style.

On the ground floor there is the "Loggia delle grida" or "Loggia della Magnifica Comunità" where the neighborhood was located. A commemorative plaque on the right of the entrance recalls the battle of Solferino on June 24, 1859 and the French marshal François Certain de Canrobert.

On the first floor there are four windows with a central balcony. The council hall, with a frescoed ceiling (1850) recently restored, in the nineteenth century housed the municipal theater of the city.

Inside, in modern style, there is an iron sculpture by the Mantuan sculptor Ferruccio Bolognesi (1924-2002) representing the characters of the Virgil's Aeneid which, according to some scholars, was born in the territory of Castel Goffredo.

== Municipal art collection ==
In the council hall the art collection is exhibited, with works representing Castel Goffredo in the twentieth century.

There is also a marble altar dating from the 1st century BC and the first century AD dedicated to Mercury found at the end of 1900 in the Poiano district and bearing the following inscription: L.V.I. / MERCUR / V.S.L.M ..

== Bibliography ==
- (in Italian) Costante Berselli, Castelgoffredo nella storia, 1978. Mantova.
- (in Italian) Francesco Bonfiglio, Notizie storiche di Castelgoffredo, 2005, Mantova. ISBN 88-7495-163-9.
- (in Italian) Vivi la città. Comune di Castel Goffredo, 1999, Reggio Emilia, curatore=Comune di Castel Goffredo.
