= Royal Academy Exhibition of 1903 =

1903 art exhibition in London

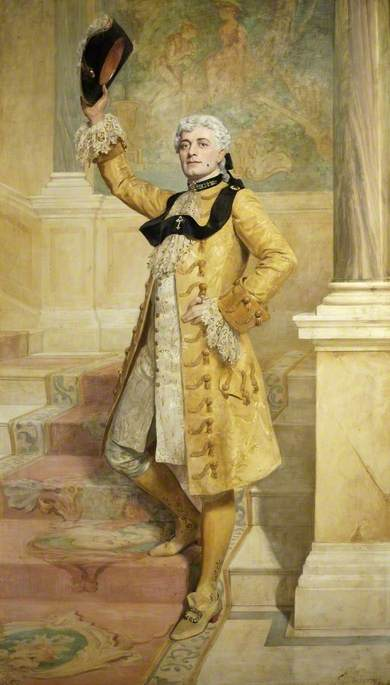
Lewis Waller as Monsieur Beaucaire by John Collier

The Royal Academy Exhibition of 1903 was the hundred and thirty fifth annual Summer Exhibition of the British Royal Academy of Arts which was held at Burlington House in London's Piccadilly from 4 May to 3 August 1903. It feature submissions from prominent painters, sculptors and architects of the Edwardian Era. Edward Poynter presided as President of the Royal Academy. It drew more than a quarter of a million visitors during its three months run.

John Collier displayed Lewis Waller as Monsieur Beaucaire, a portrait of the popular stage star in one of his best-known roles. In addition Collier exhibited The Prodigal Daughter, a genre painting with an ambiguous subject matter. John William Waterhouse's Echo and Narcissus was inspired by Ovid's Metamorphoses.

John Singer Sargent displayed six portraits featuring figures from High society. Amongst those who featured was the aristocrat Lady Evelyn Cavendish as well as Mary Chamberlain, the wife of the politician Joseph Chamberlain and stepmother of the future Prime Minister Neville Chamberlain. John Watson Nicol was commissioned by the United Service Club to produce a portrait of the German Emperor Wilhelm II, the nephew of Edward VII, who a decade later would lead Germany into the First World War.

Ernest Crofts exhibited a depiction of the State Funeral of Queen Victoria in 1901, showing the procession passing through central London. Ernest Albert Waterlow's The Banks of the River Loing was his diploma work for the Royal Academy. John Charlton's history painting depicted the Battle of Rossbach. William Quiller Orchardson's Sarah Siddons in the Studio of Sir Joshua Reynolds reimagined the creation of the famous eighteenth century painting Sarah Siddons as the Tragic Muse. Elizabeth Thompson, known for her battlefield scenes, displayed Within Sound of the Guns featuring a depiction Boer War. William Barnes Wollen also featured a battle scene from the war The South Lancashires Storming the Boer Trenches at Pieters Hill. Two works by the Austrian Franz Xaver Kosler were shown posthumously.

There was a notable presence of British Impressionists, particularly those associated with the Newlyn School based in Cornwall. Many of these figures had also been involved with the New English Art Club, a rival to the Royal Academy. While many of the established artists such as Stanhope Forbes and Henry Scott Tuke were now associate members of the Academy, a younger generation led by Alfred Munnings were also emerging. Munnings displayed five paintings that year including The Last of the Fair and The Woodcutter.

== Gallery ==
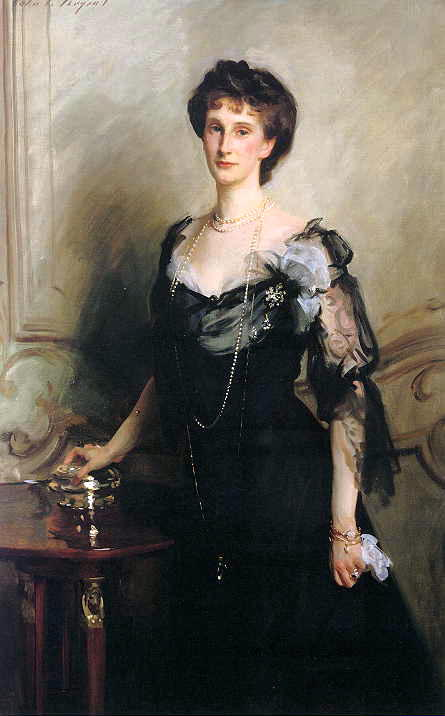
Portrait of Lady Evelyn Cavendish by John Singer Sargent

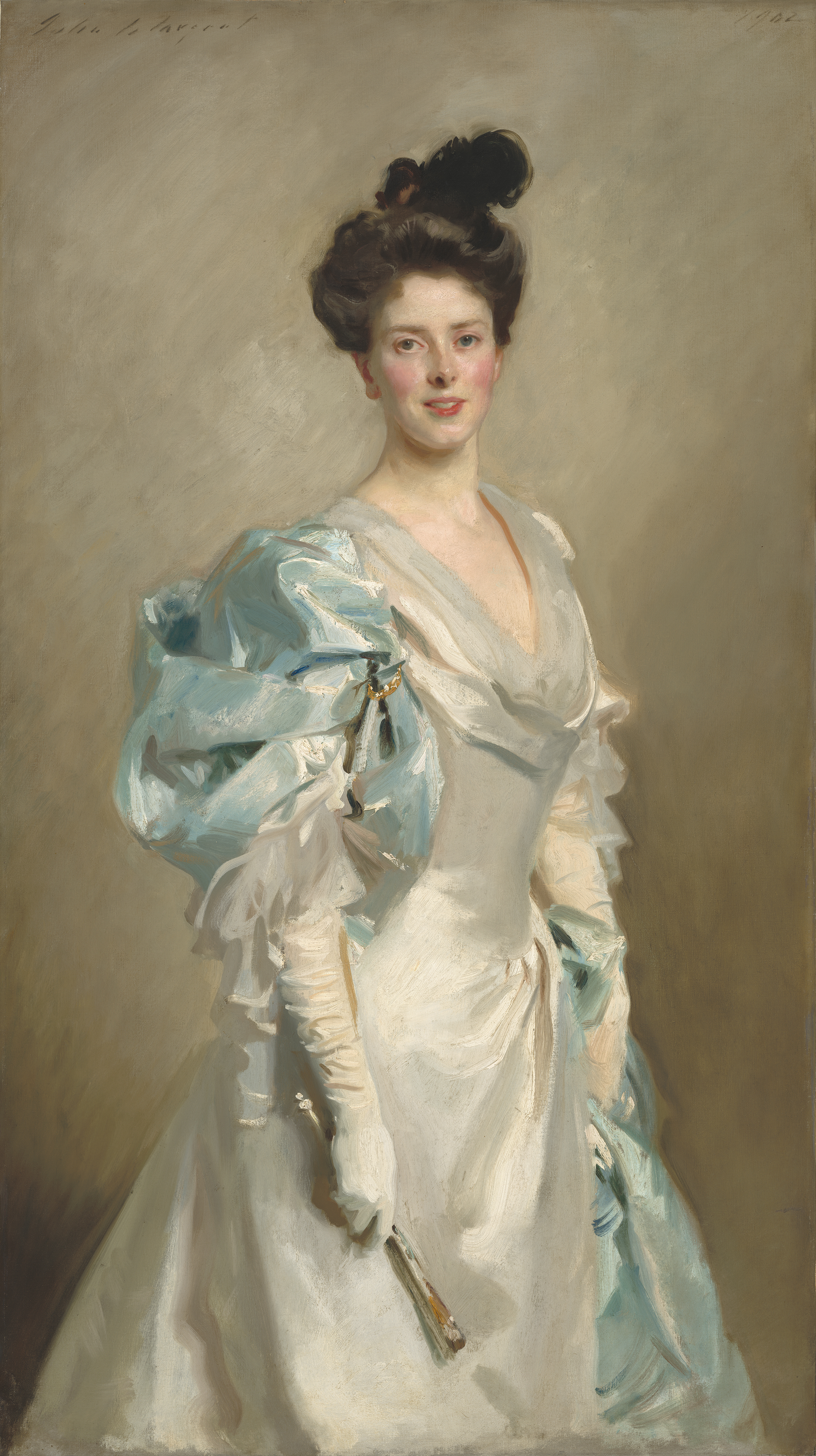
Portrait of Mary Chamberlain by John Singer Sargent

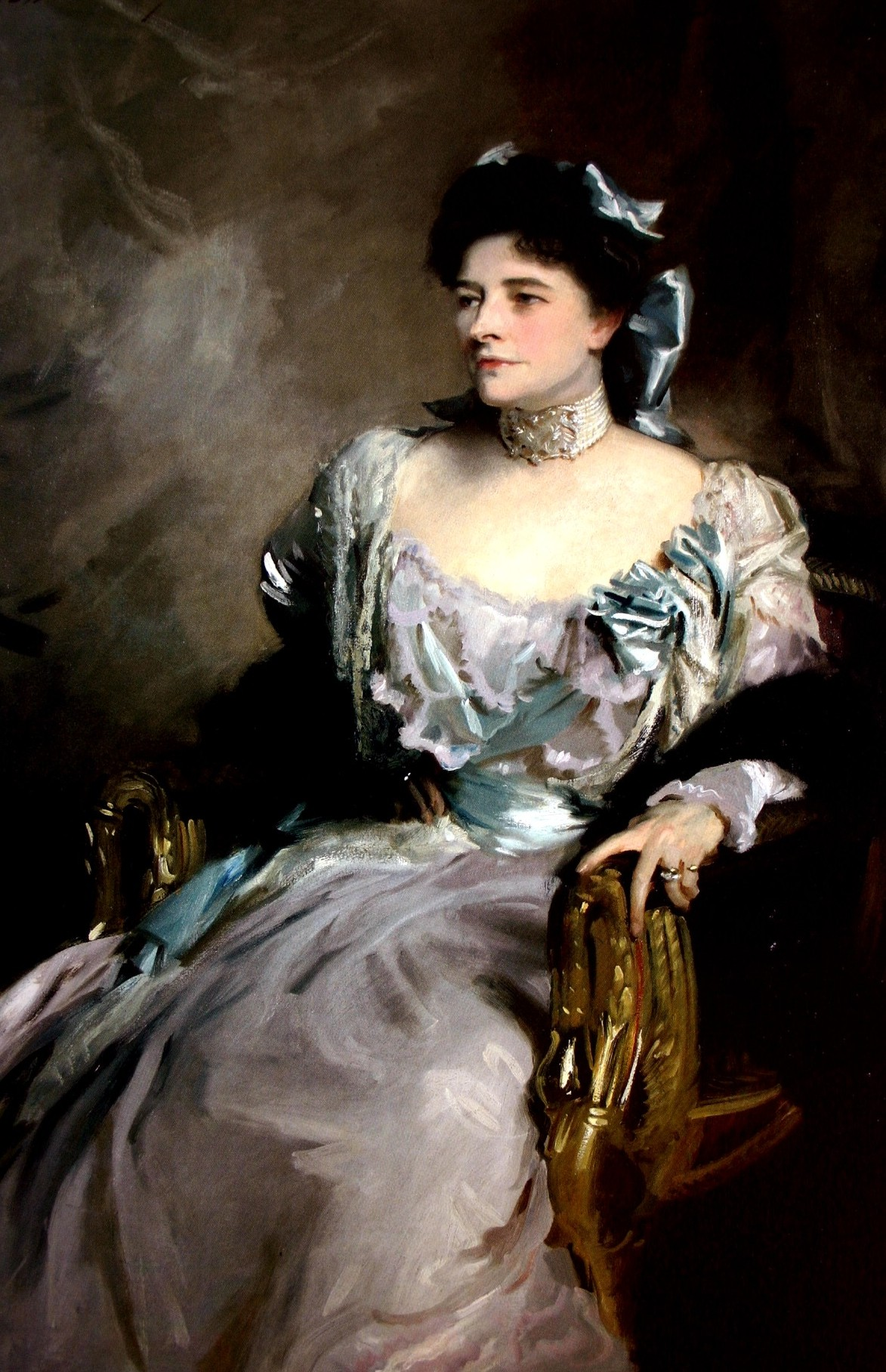
Portrait of Alice Wernher by John Singer Sargent

Portrait of George Frederick McCorquodale by John Singer Sargent

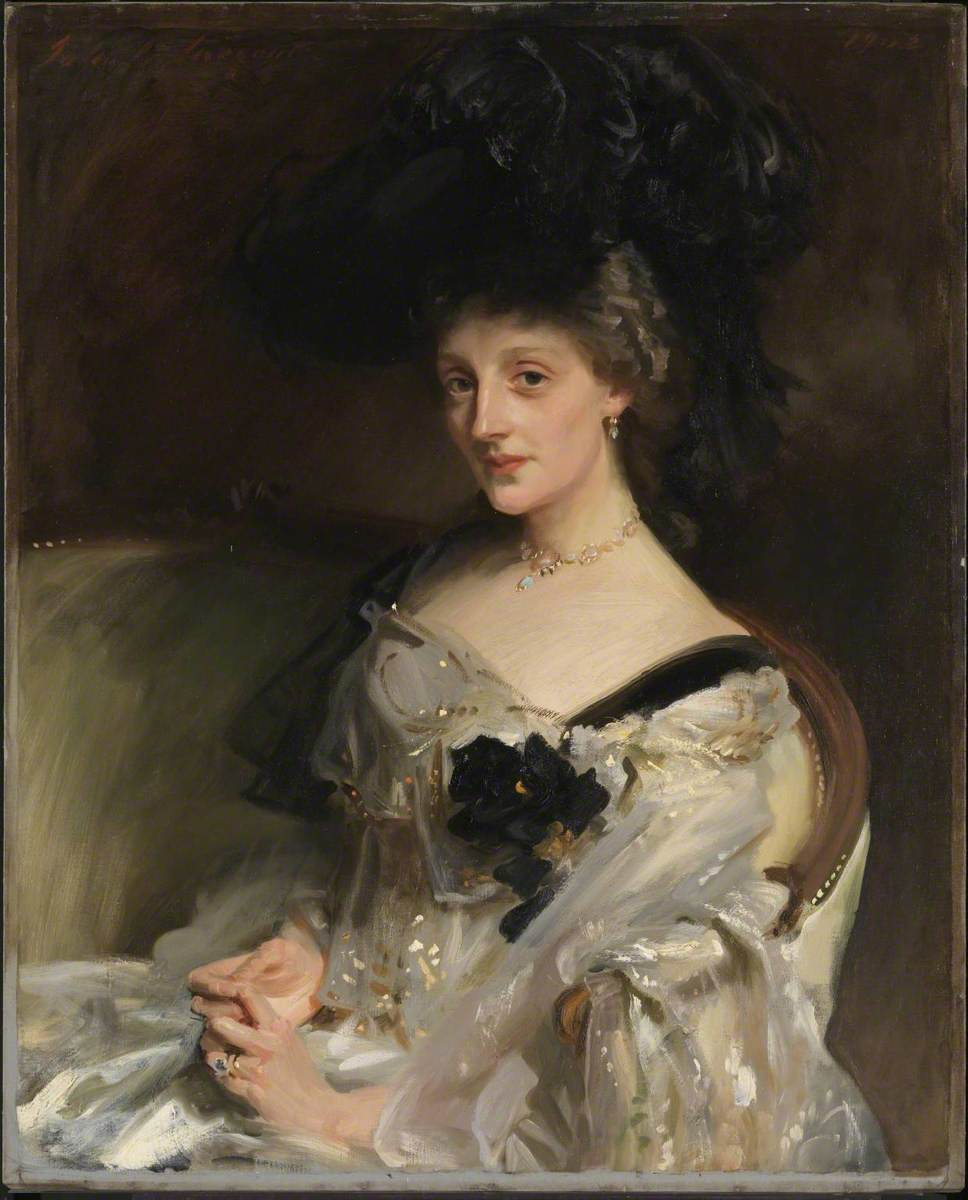
Portrait of Georgette Agnew by John Singer Sargent

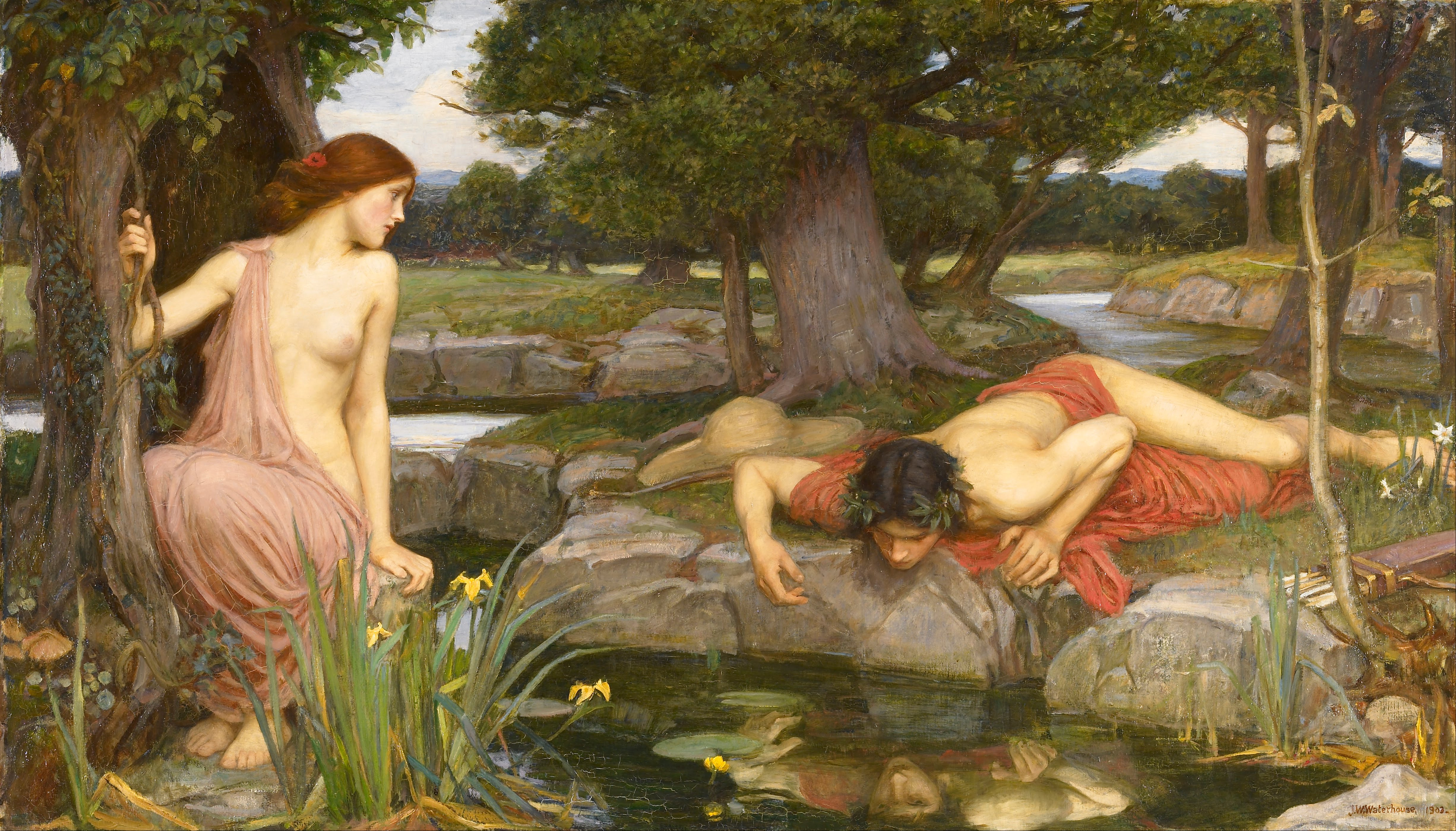
Echo and Narcissus by John William Waterhouse

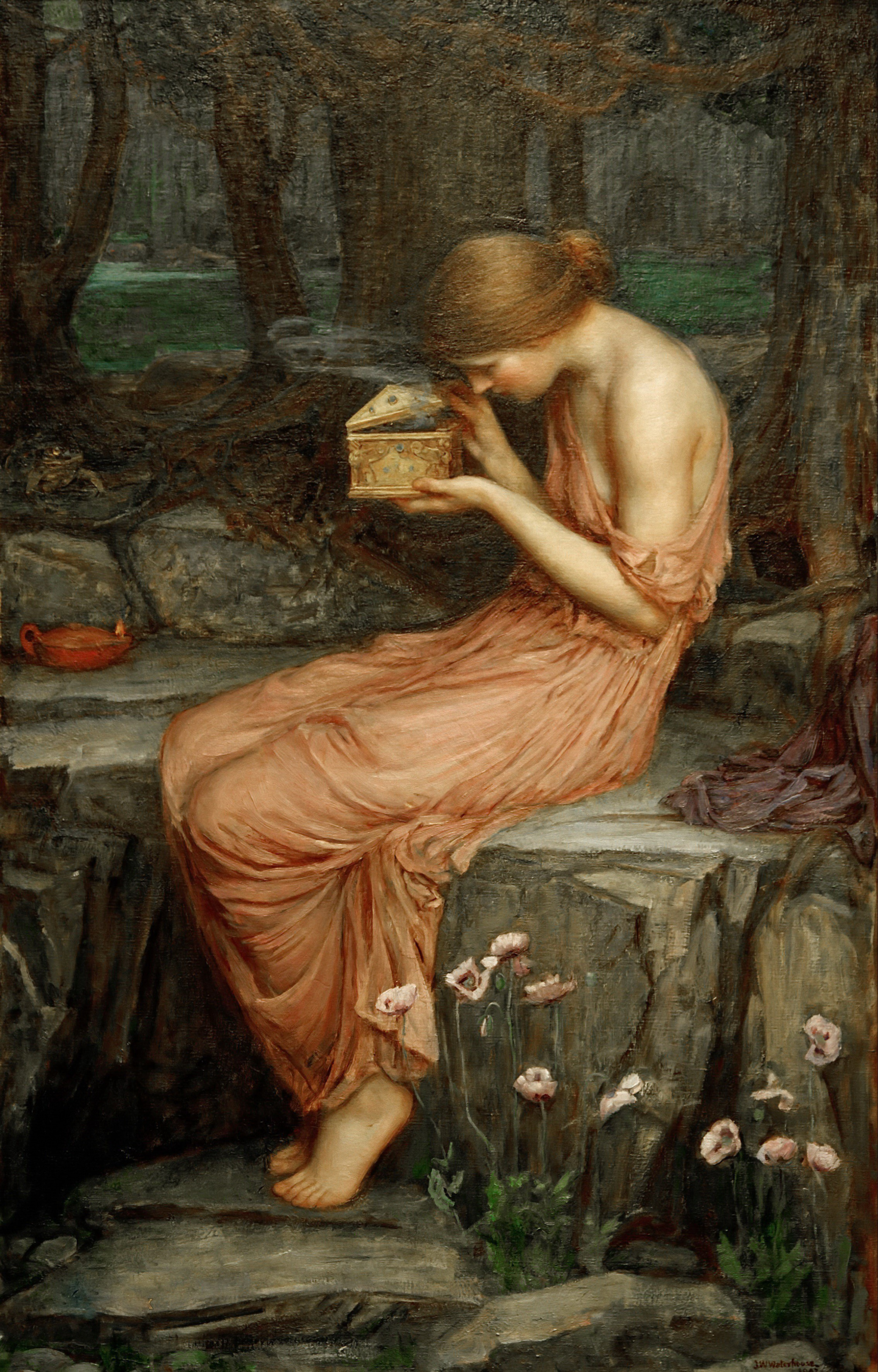
Psyche Opening the Golden Box by John William Waterhouse

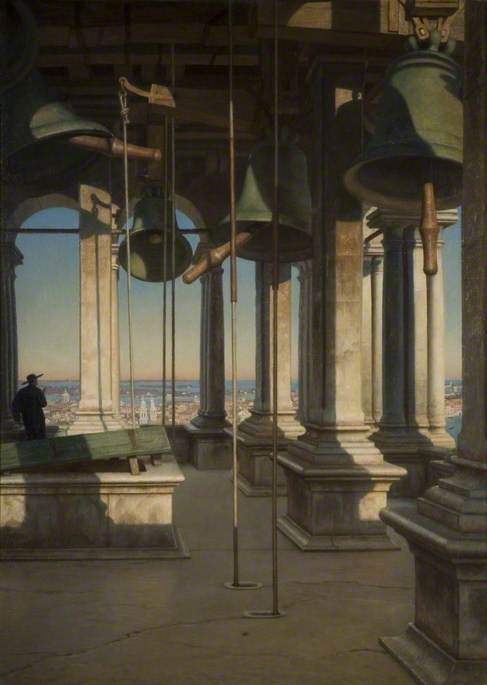
The Bells of Saint Mark's, Venice by Edward Poynter

The Cave of the Storm Nymphs by Edward Poynter

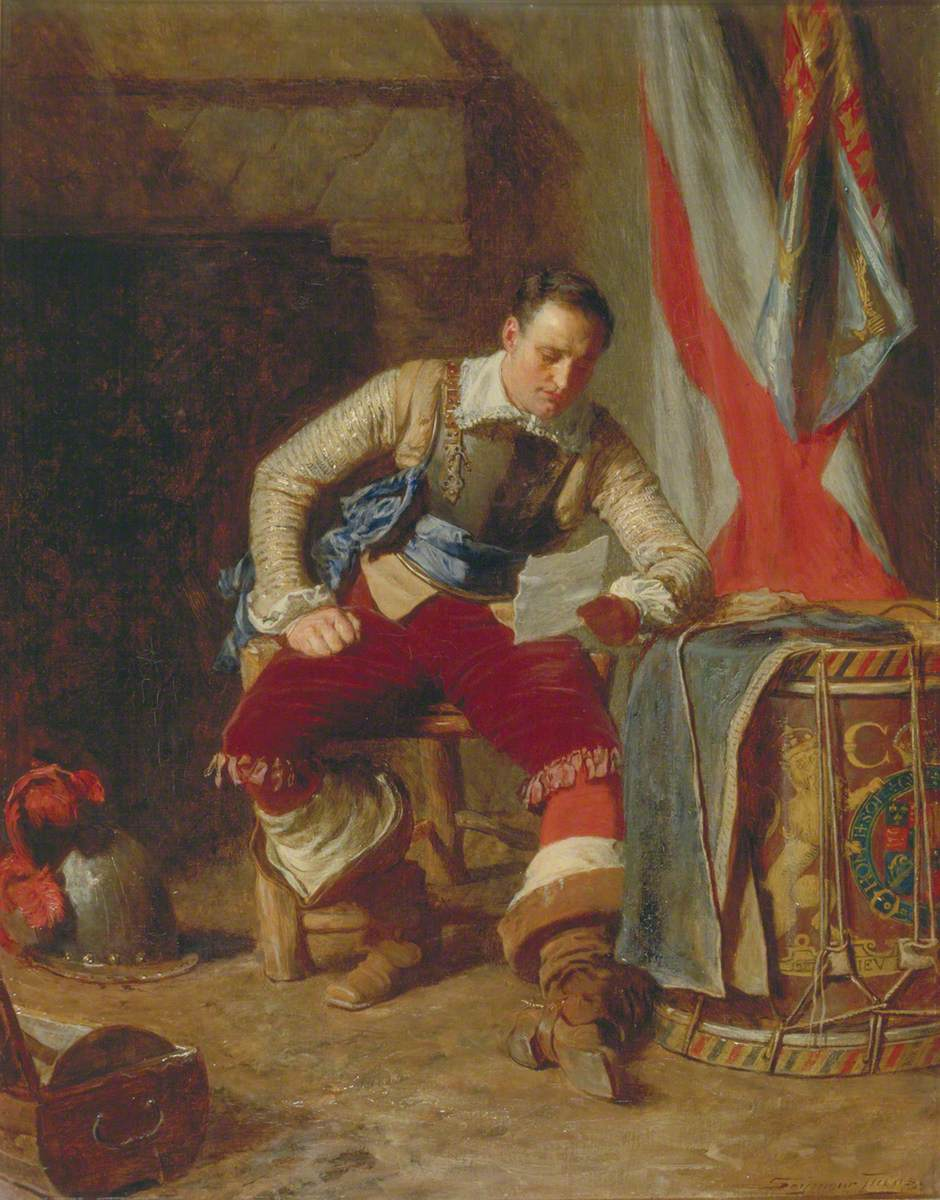
The Standard-Bearer by John Seymour Lucas

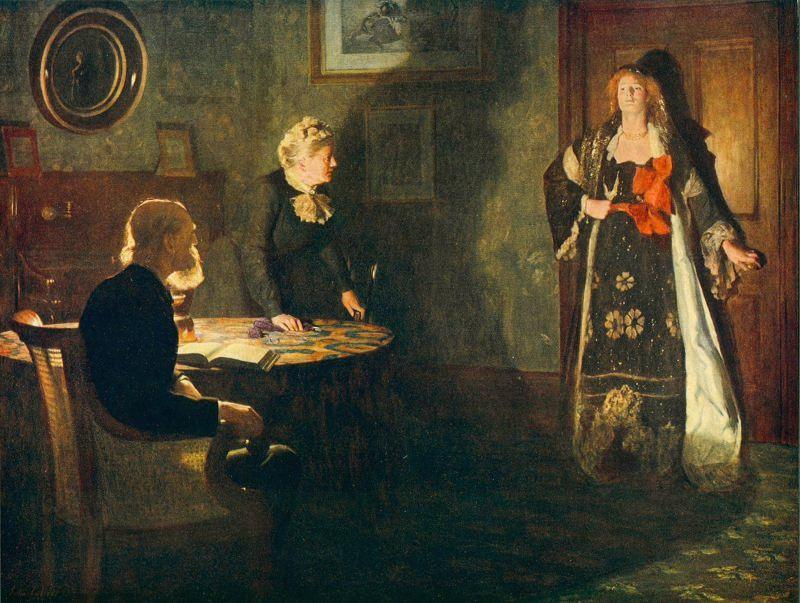
The Prodigal Daughter by John Collier

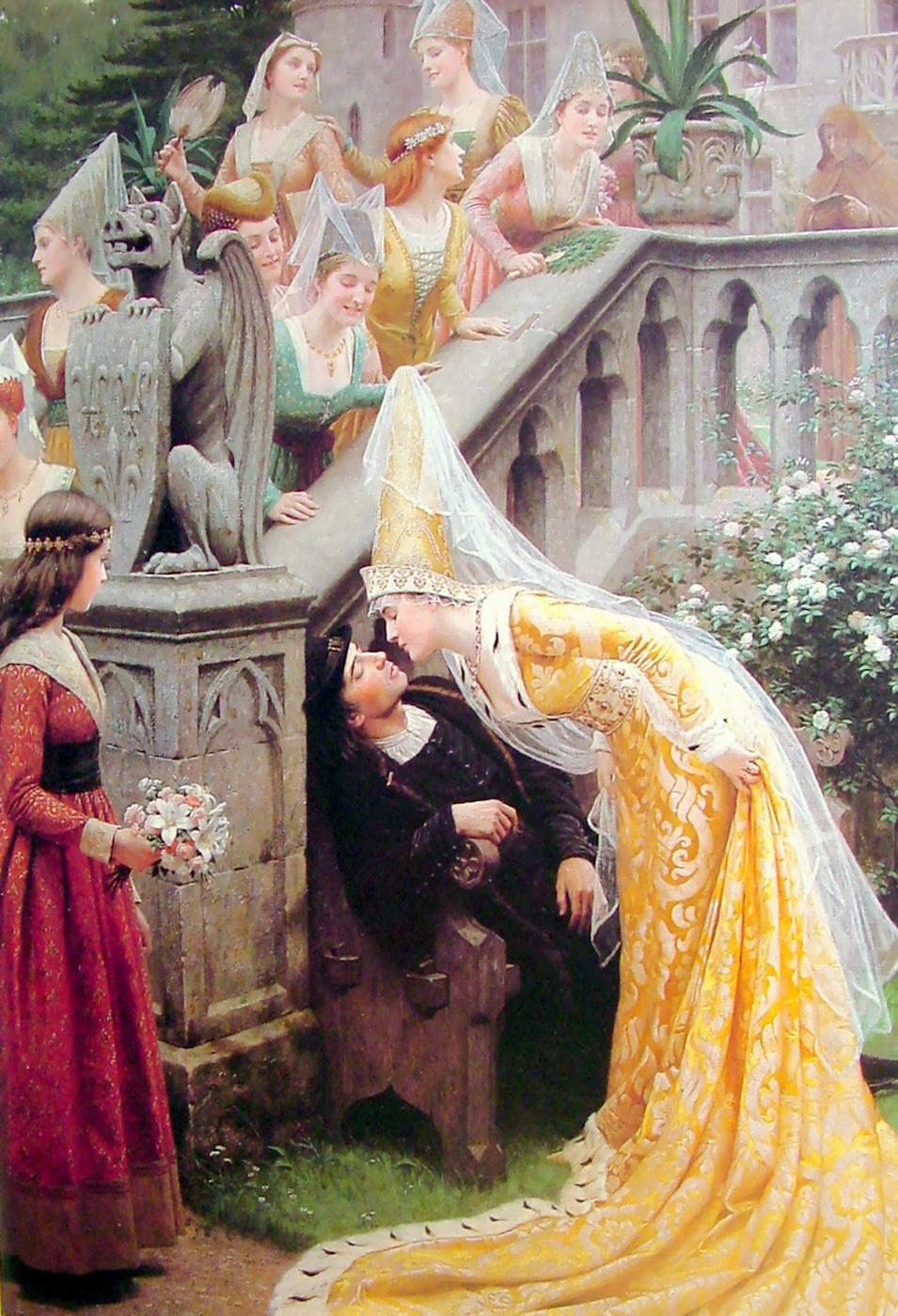
Alain Chartier by Edmund Blair Leighton

The Banks of the River Loing by Ernest Albert Waterlow

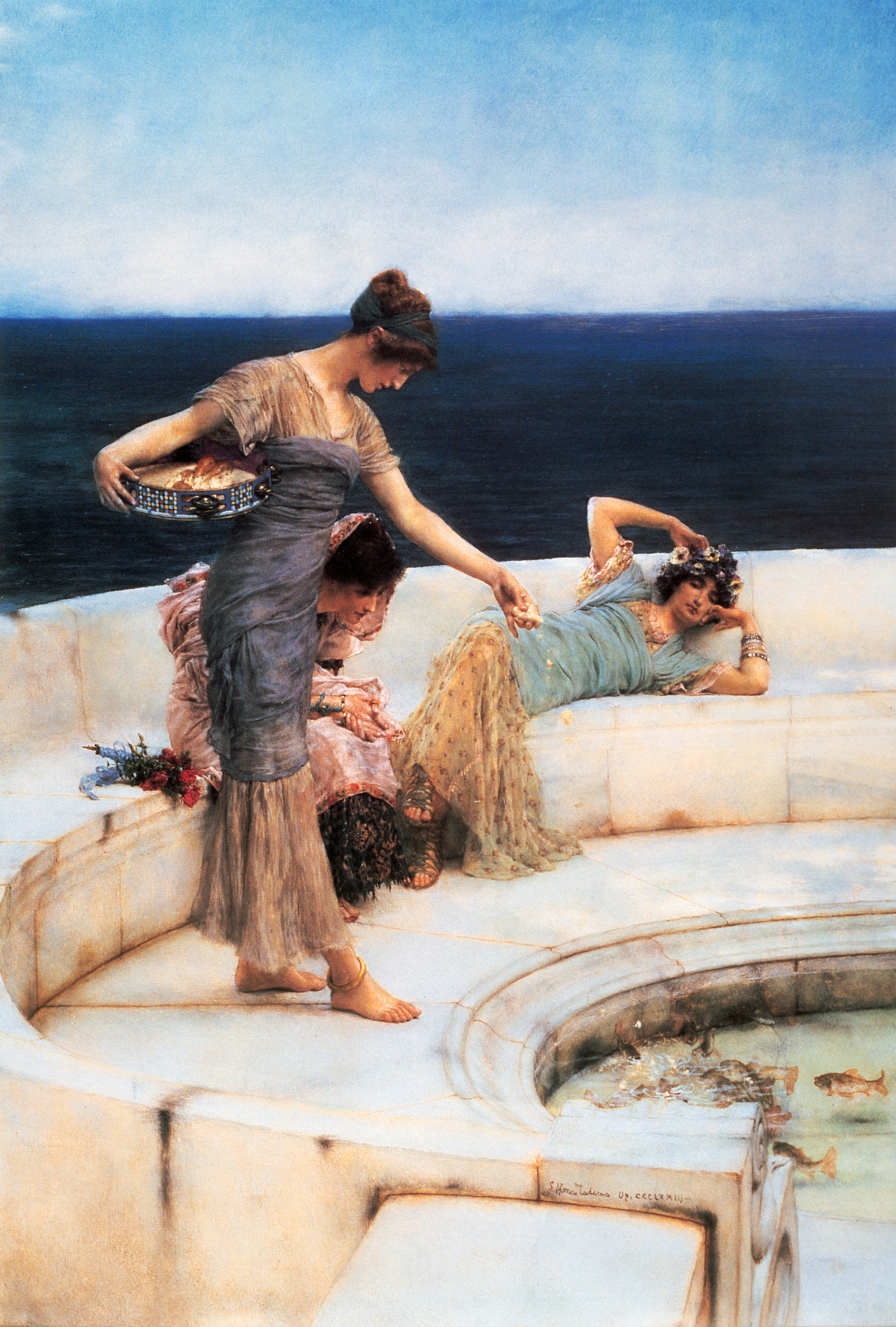
Silver Favourites by Lawrence Alma-Tadema

His Ship in Sight by Marcus Stone

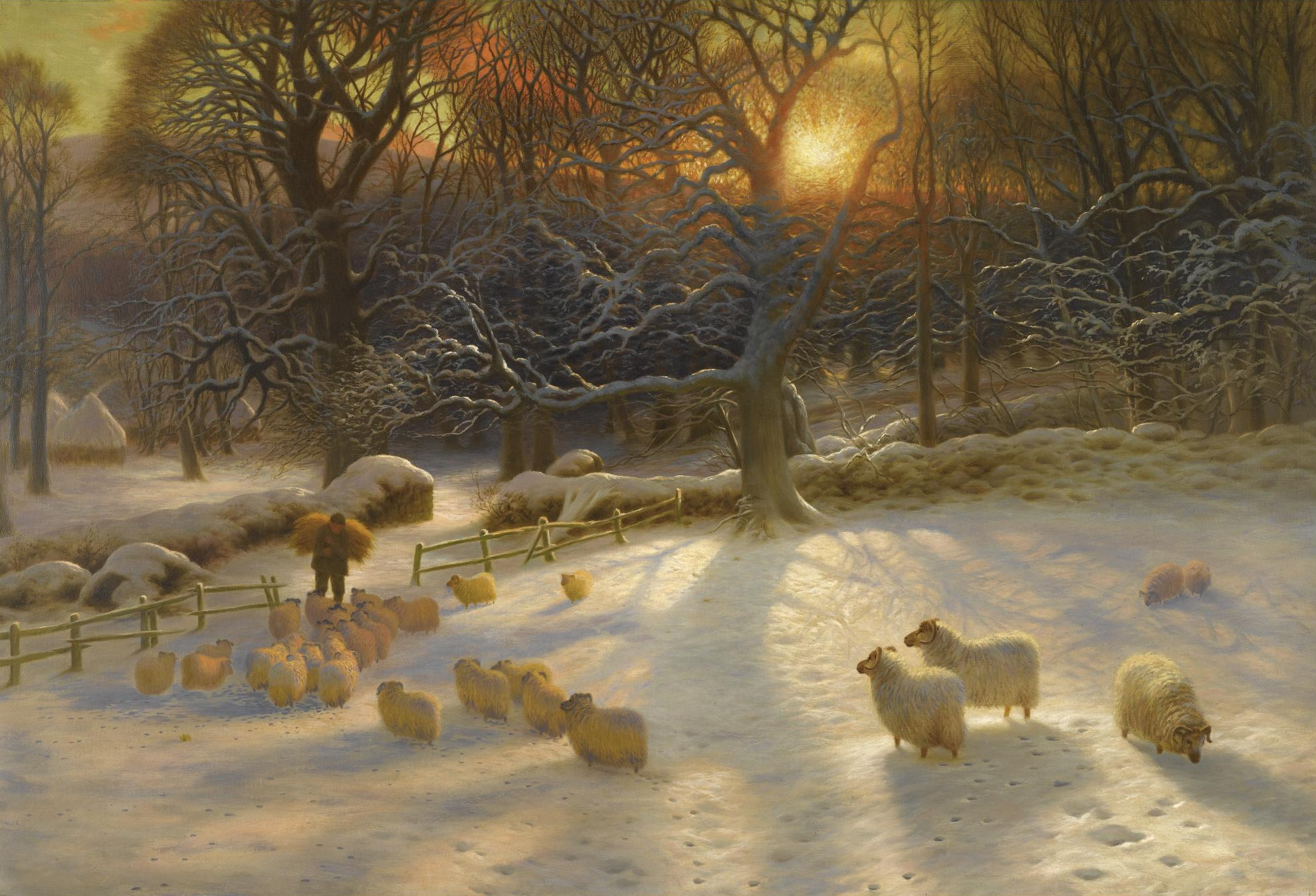
The Shortening Winter's Day is near a Close by Joseph Farquharson

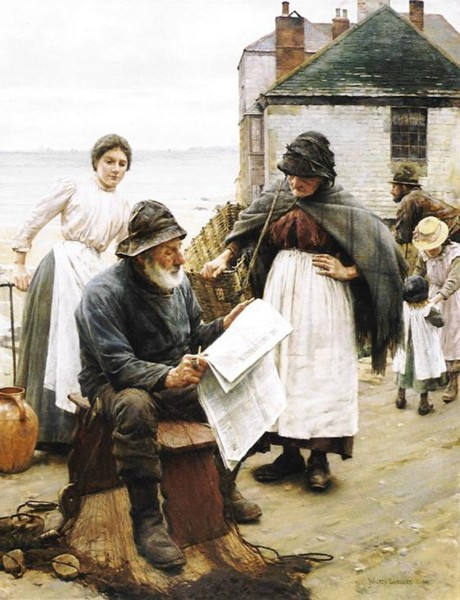
When The Boats are Away by Walter Langley

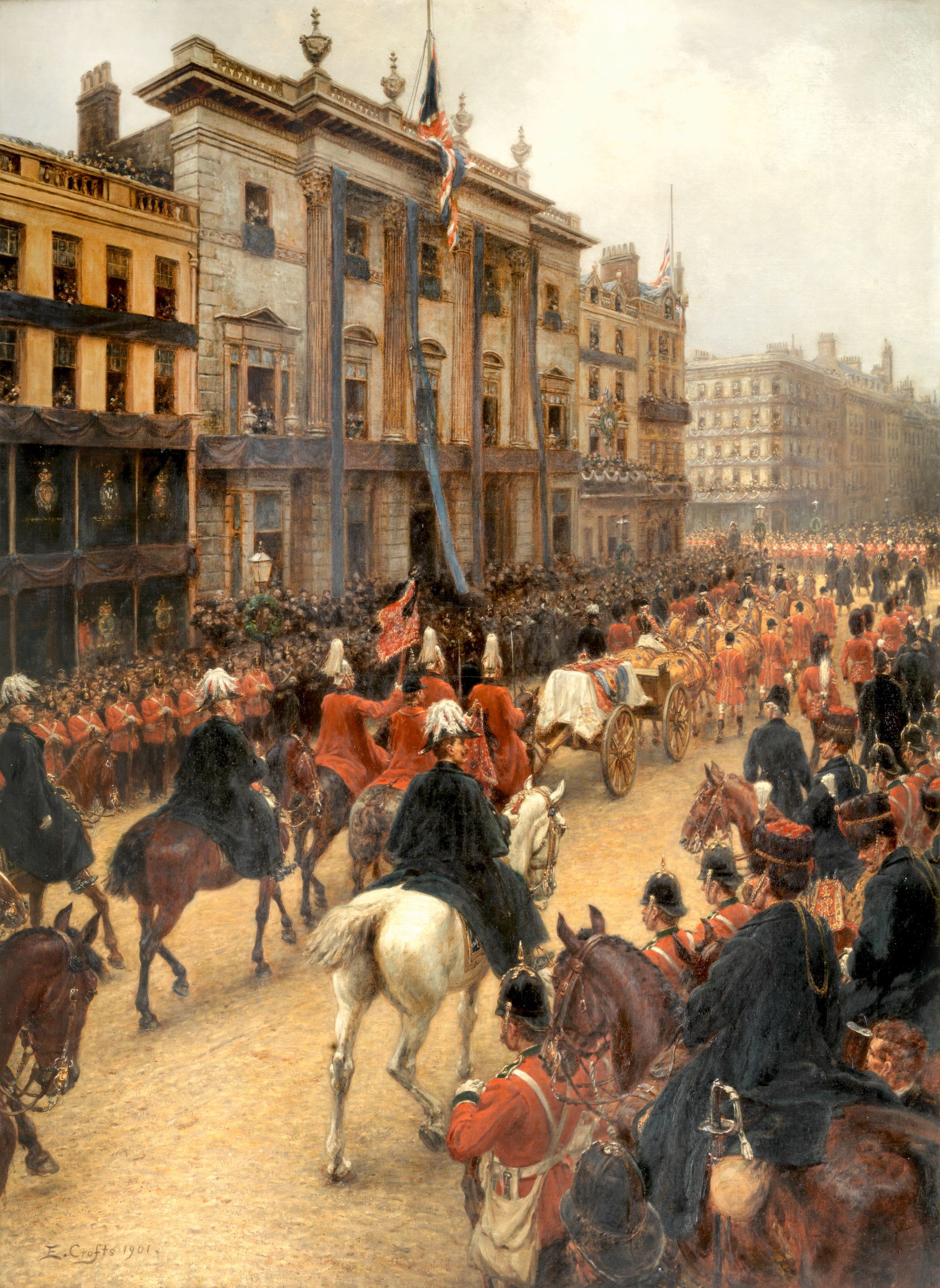
Funeral of Her late Majesty Queen Victoria by Ernest Crofts

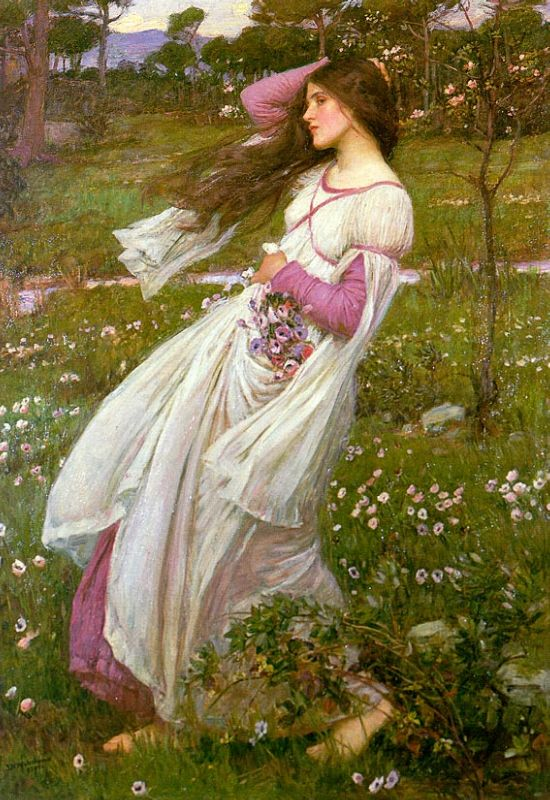
Windflowers by John William Waterhouse

Coming Day by John Arnesby Brown

June by David Murray

In the Country of Constable by David Murray

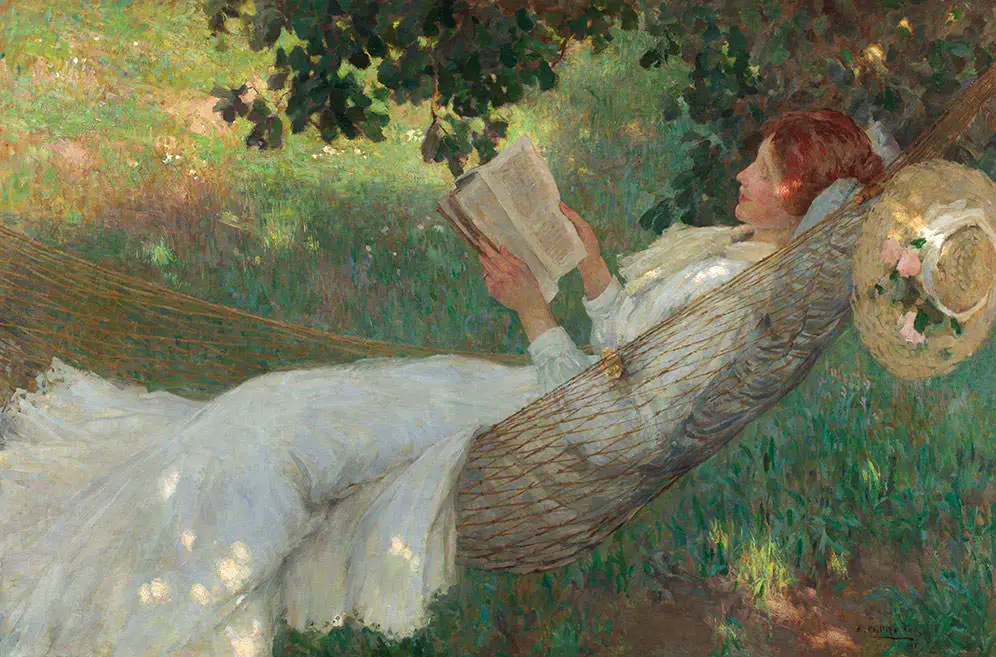
A Love Story by E. Phillips Fox

The Backwater by Charles William Wyllie

Apple Blossoms in the Upper Wye by Henry William Banks Davis

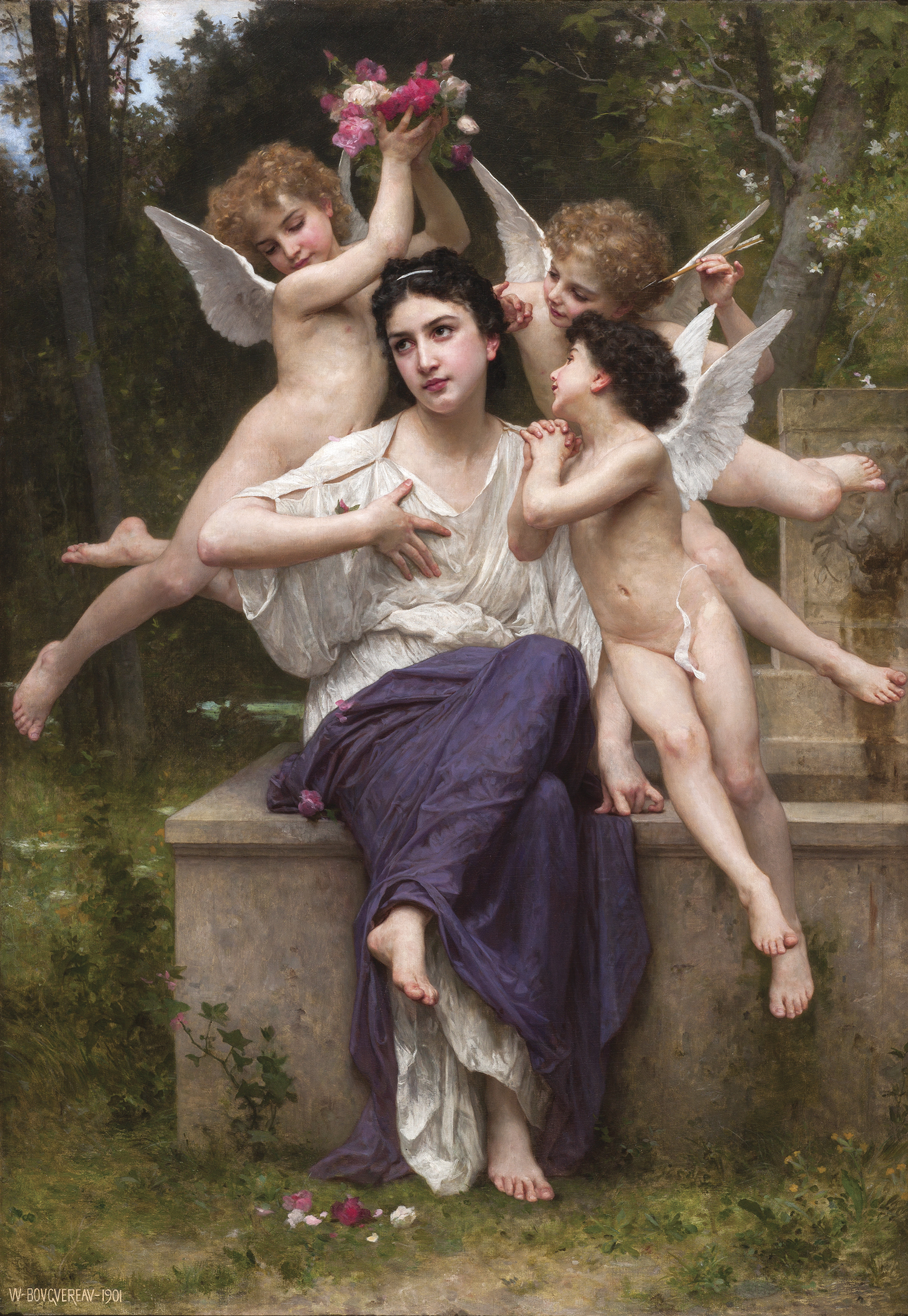
Rêve de printemps by William-Adolphe Bouguereau

The Hay Cart by Stanhope Forbes

Round the Camp Fire by Stanhope Forbes

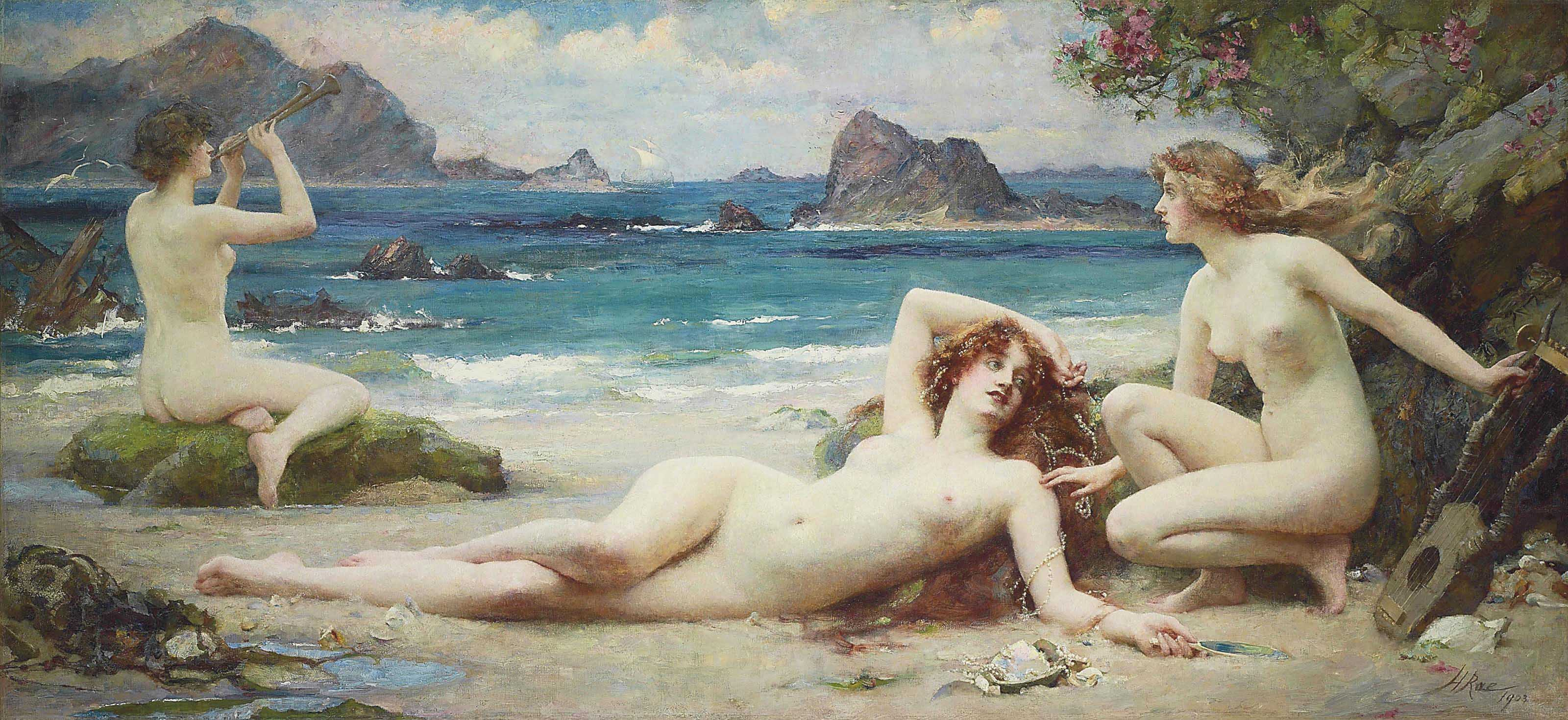
The Sirens by Henrietta Rae

Warkworth Castle, Northumberland by Ernest Albert Waterlow

Provençal Winter by Henry Herbert La Thangue

Mowing Bracken by Henry Herbert La Thangue

At a Provençal Spring by Henry Herbert La Thangue

The Homage-Giving: Westminster Abbey, 9 August, 1902 by John Henry Frederick Bacon

A Summer Morning by Benjamin Haughton

Tintern, Valley of the Wye by Alfred East

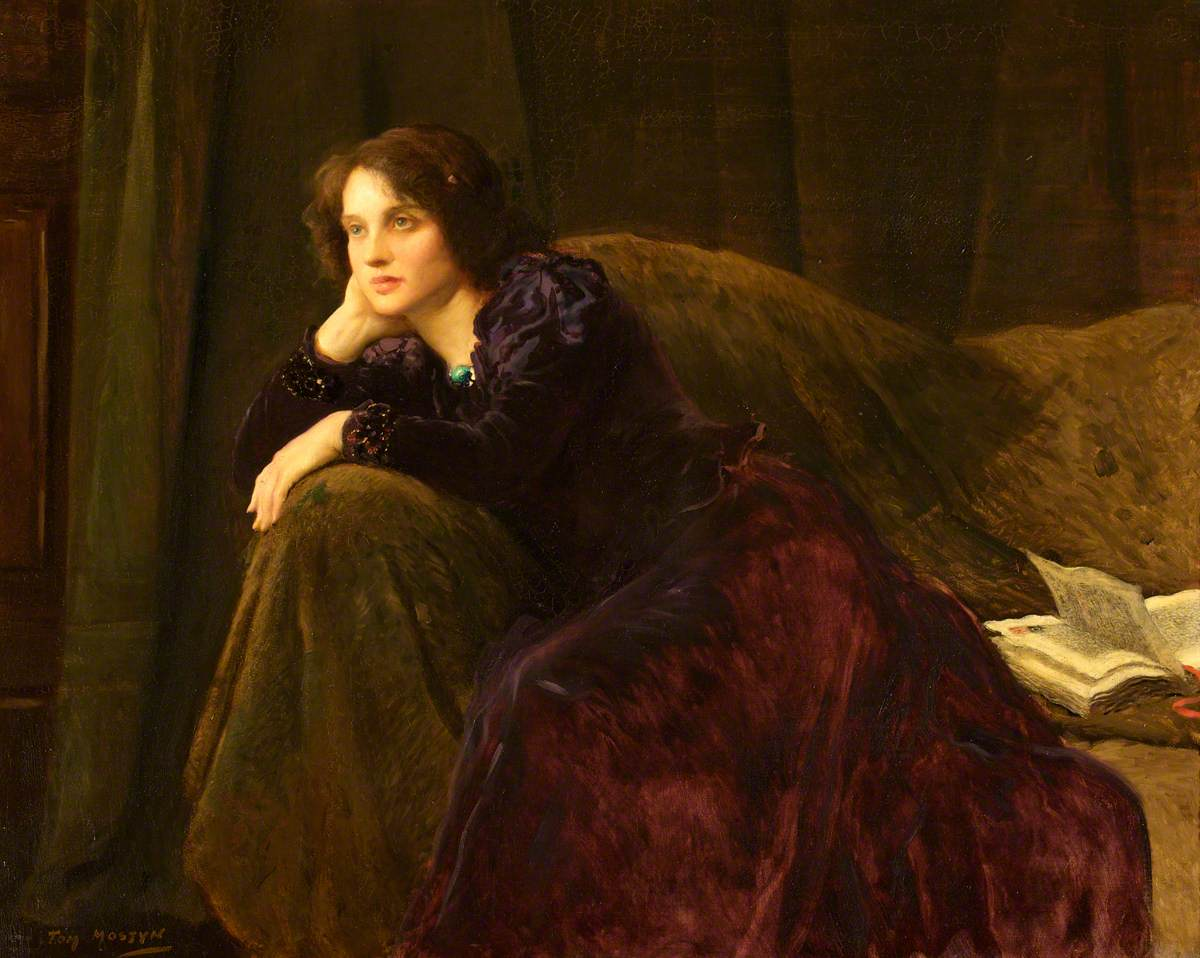
Unsolved by Thomas Edwin Mostyn

A Parasite by George Frederic Watts

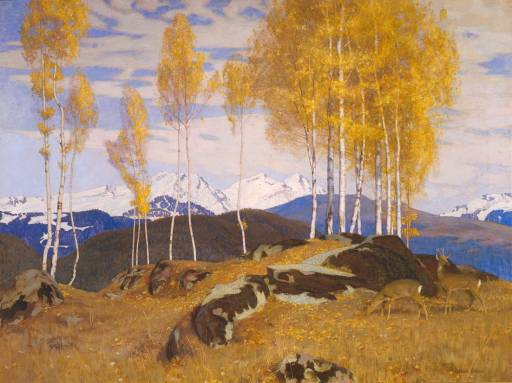
Autumn in the Mountains by Adrian Scott Stokes

The Home Squadron by John Robertson Reid

Scotch Firs, Rothiemurchus by John MacWhirter

Will-o'-the-Wisp by Fred Stead

A Net Maker by Henry Woods

One of Our Conquerors by Frank Dicksee

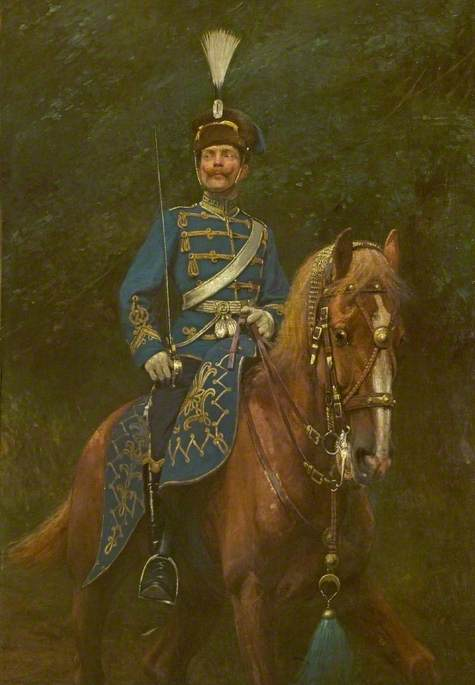
The Blue Hussar by William Frank Calderon

A Little Norwegian by Thomas Edwin Mostyn

Dawn by Joseph Farquharson

The Village at Night by George Clausen

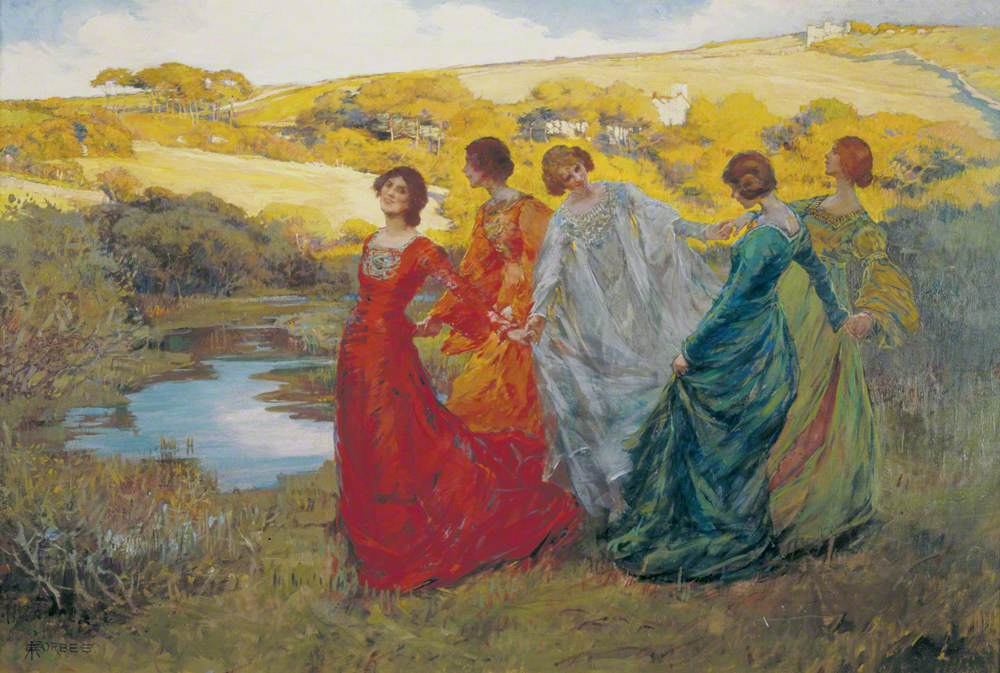
On a Fine Day by Elizabeth Forbes

A Country Cousin by Edgar Bundy

The Fool Who Would Please Every Man by Byam Shaw

After a Gale by William Trost Richards

Miserere, Domini! by Saint George Hare

The White Squall by Albert Julius Olsson

Muscats by William Jabez Muckley

A Turkish Boat, Ragusa by Terrick Williams

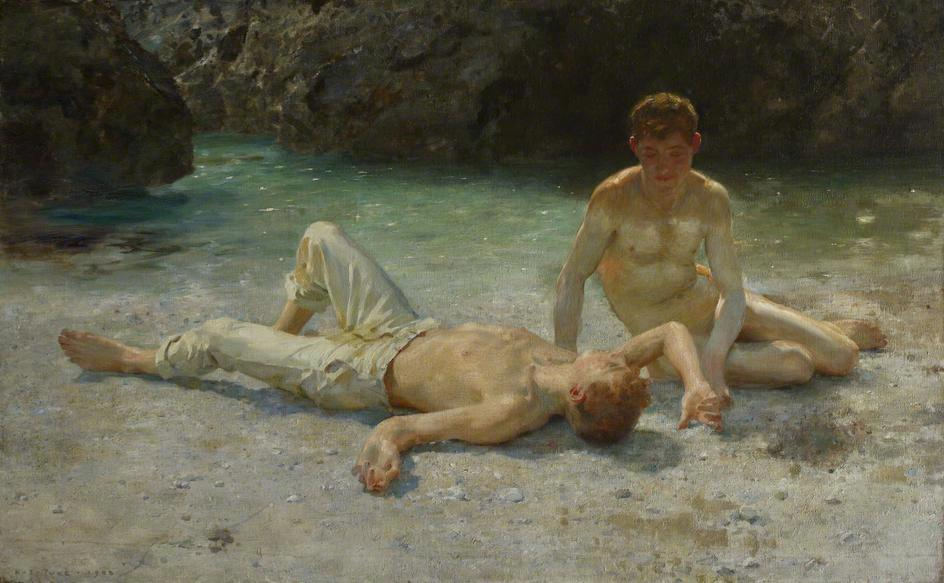
Noonday Heat by Henry Scott Tuke

The Chess Players by Samuel Melton Fisher

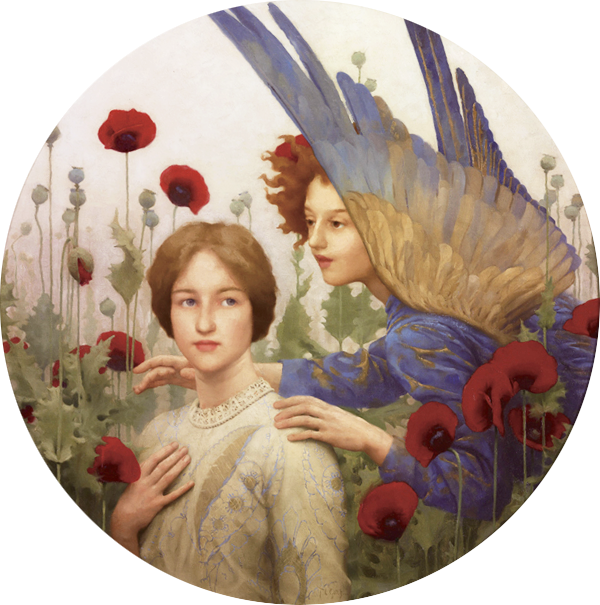
The Message by Thomas Cooper Gotch

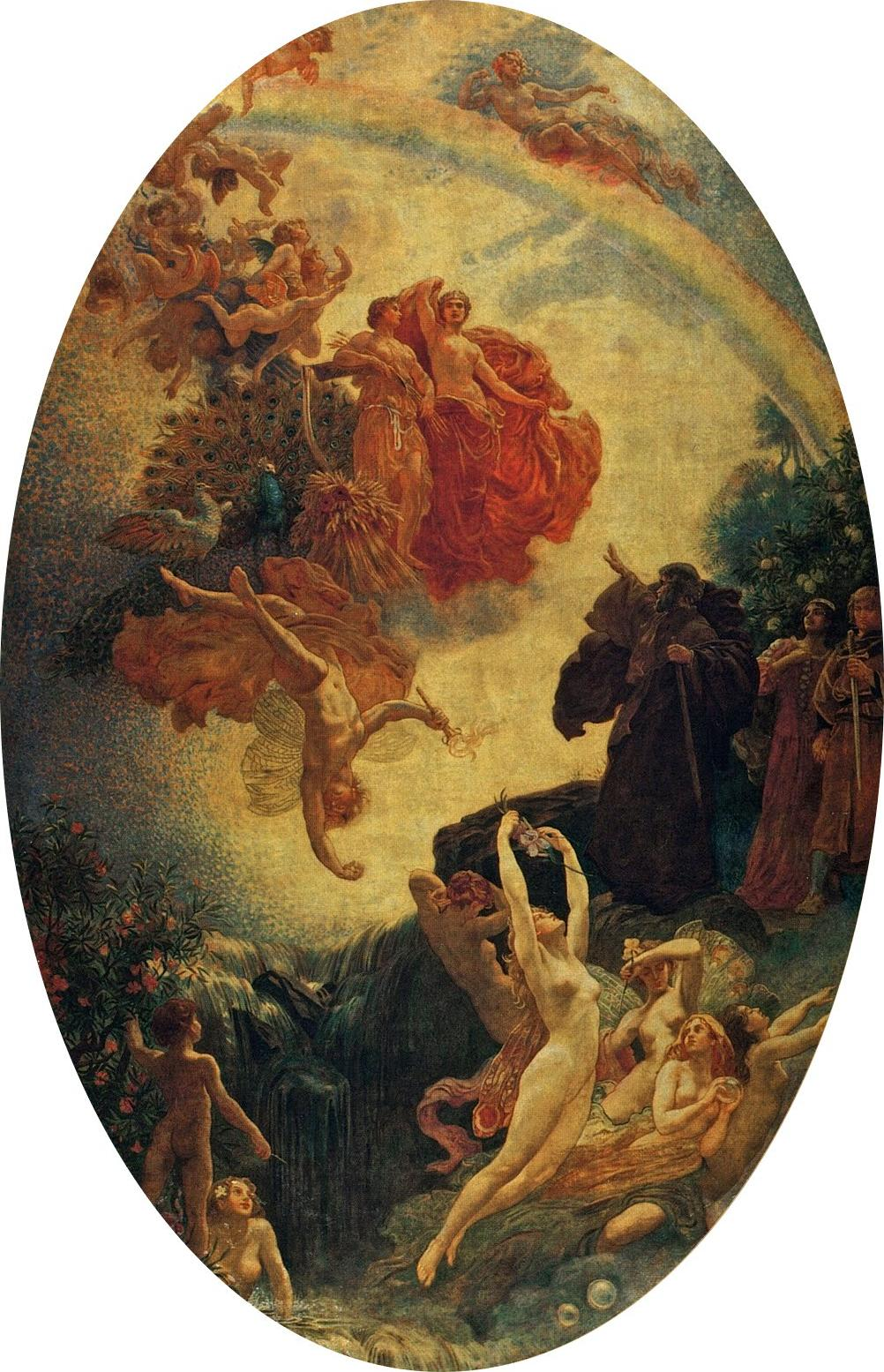
Prospero Summoning Nymphs and Deities by Herbert James Draper

On the Threshold by Ernest Normand

Hunt the Slipper by Frederick Morgan

Rediviva by Edward John Gregory

Alas That Spring Should Vanish with the Rose by William Mouat Loudan

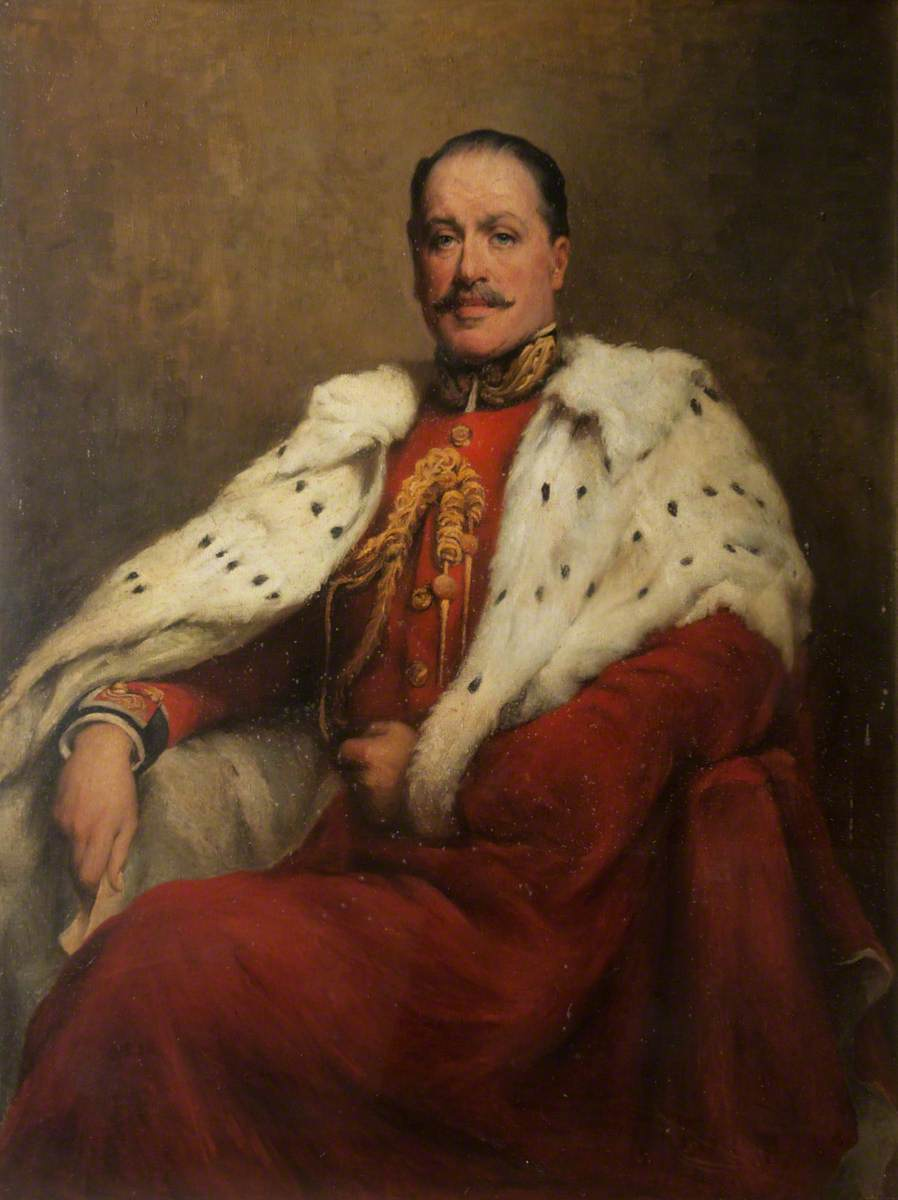
Portrait of Earl Cawdor by Walter William Ouless

Portrait of Alexander Samuel Leslie-Melville by Frank Bramley

Portrait of Edward Letchworth by Walter William Ouless

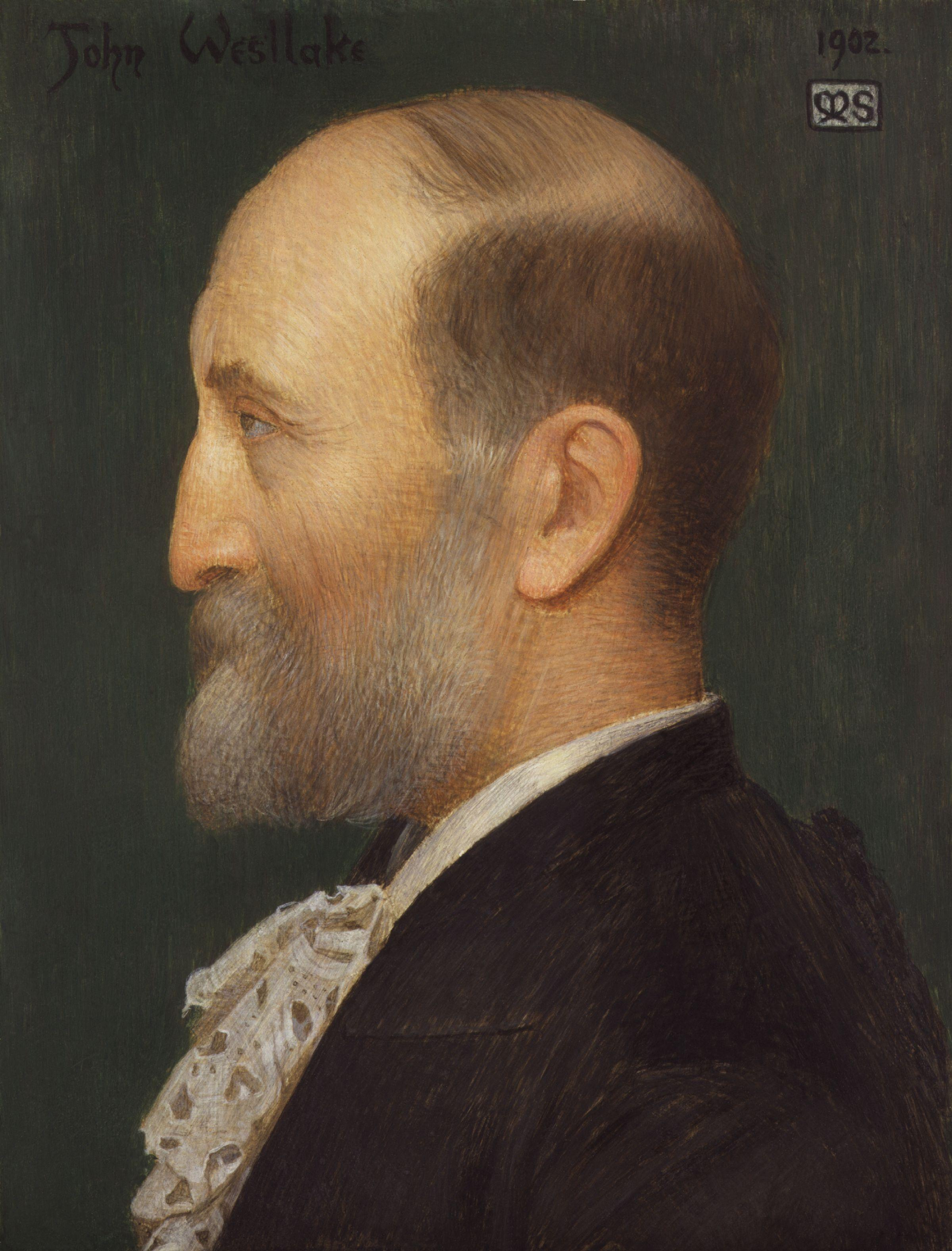
Portrait of John Westlake by Marianne Stokes

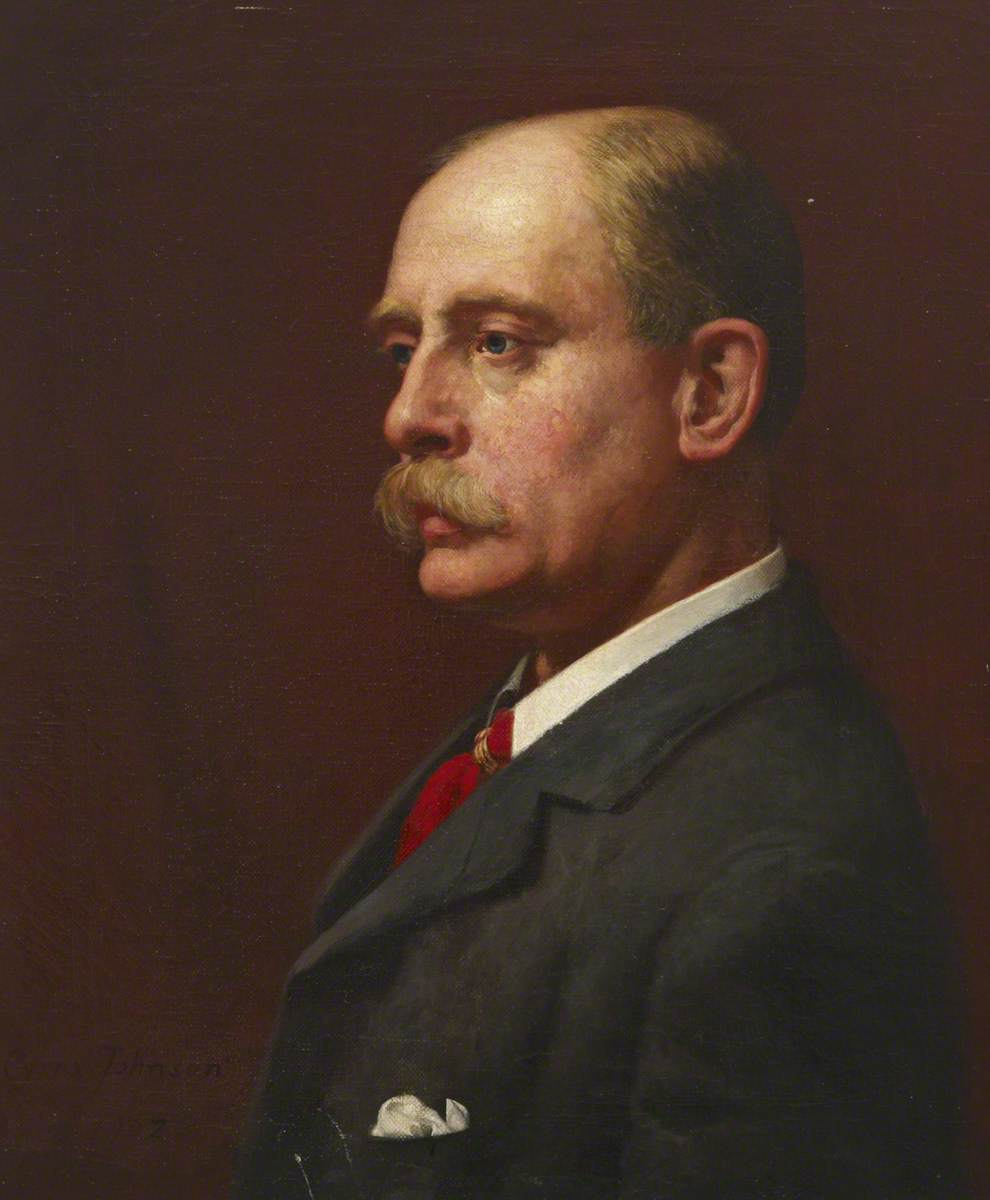
Portrait of Bryan Donkin by Cyrus Johnson

Portrait of William Groom by Frederick George Cotman

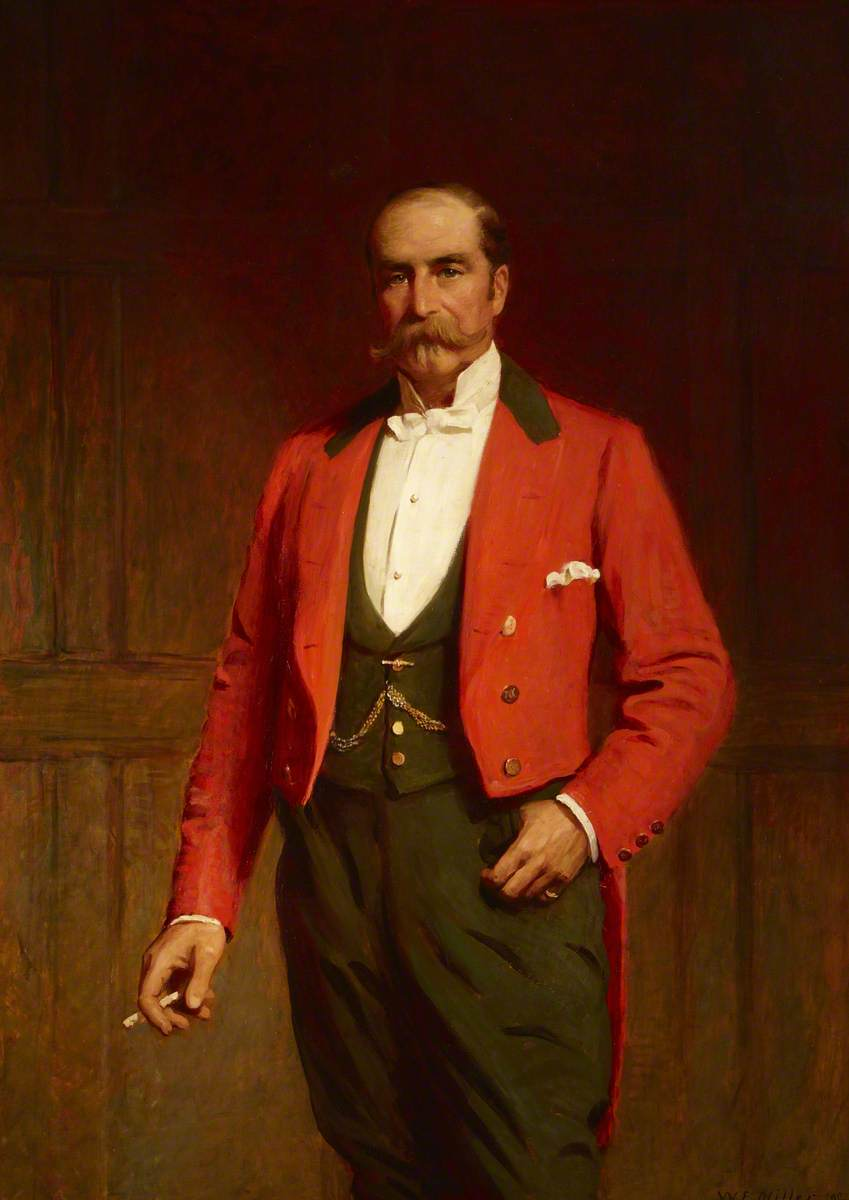
Portrait of the Earl of Enniskillen by William Edwards Miller

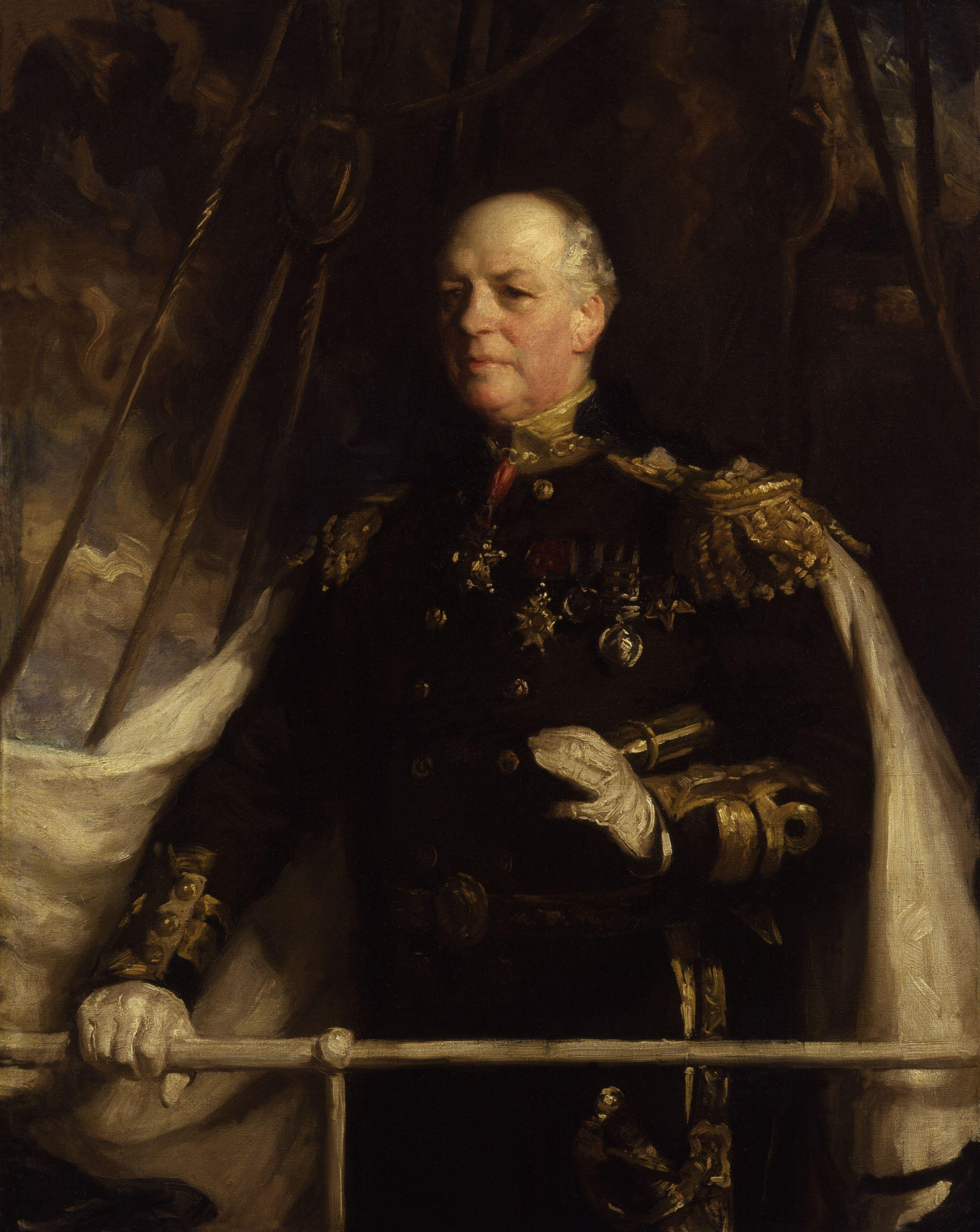
Portrait of Lord Charles Beresford by Charles Wellington Furse

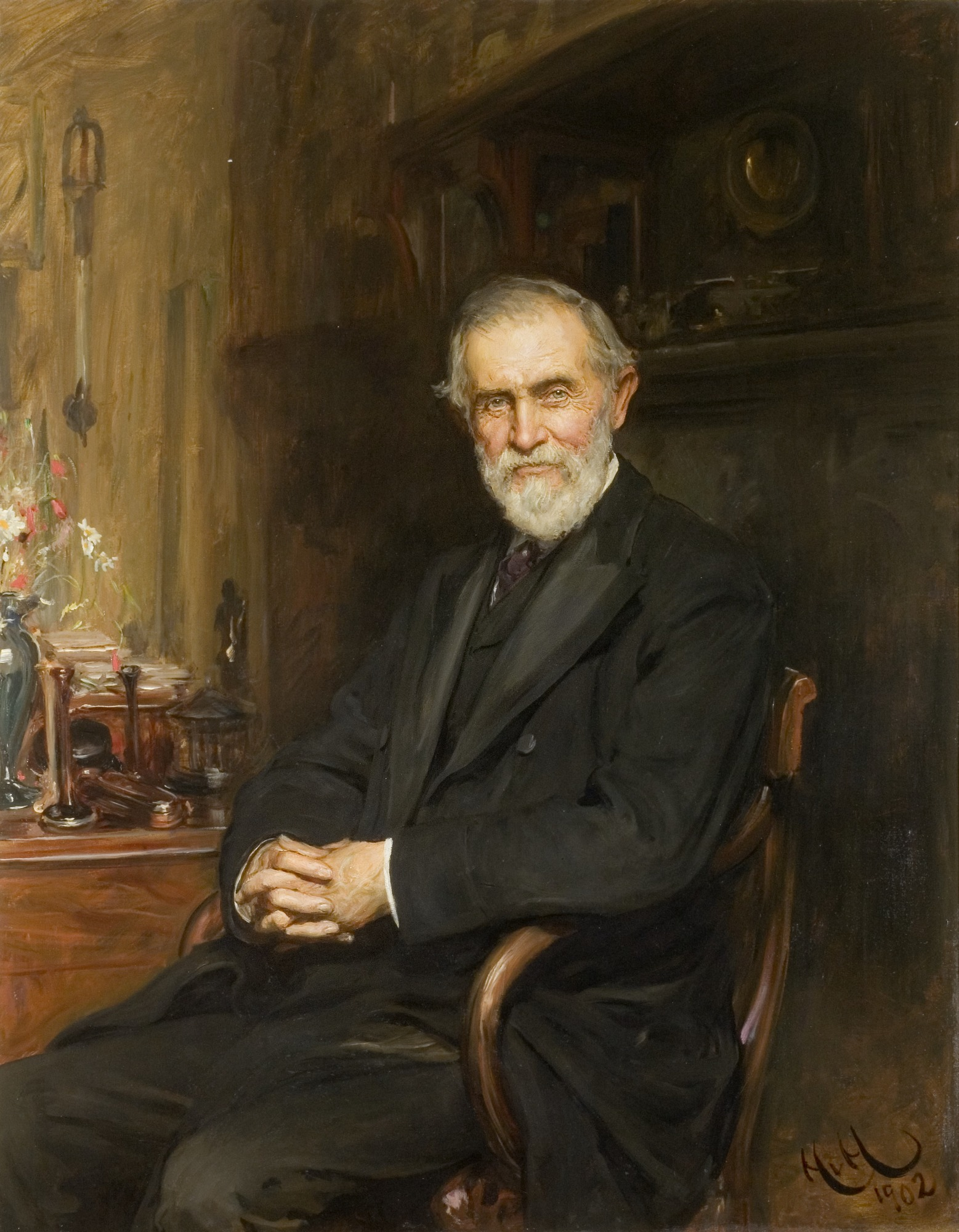
Portrait of Hermann David Weber by Hubert von Herkomer

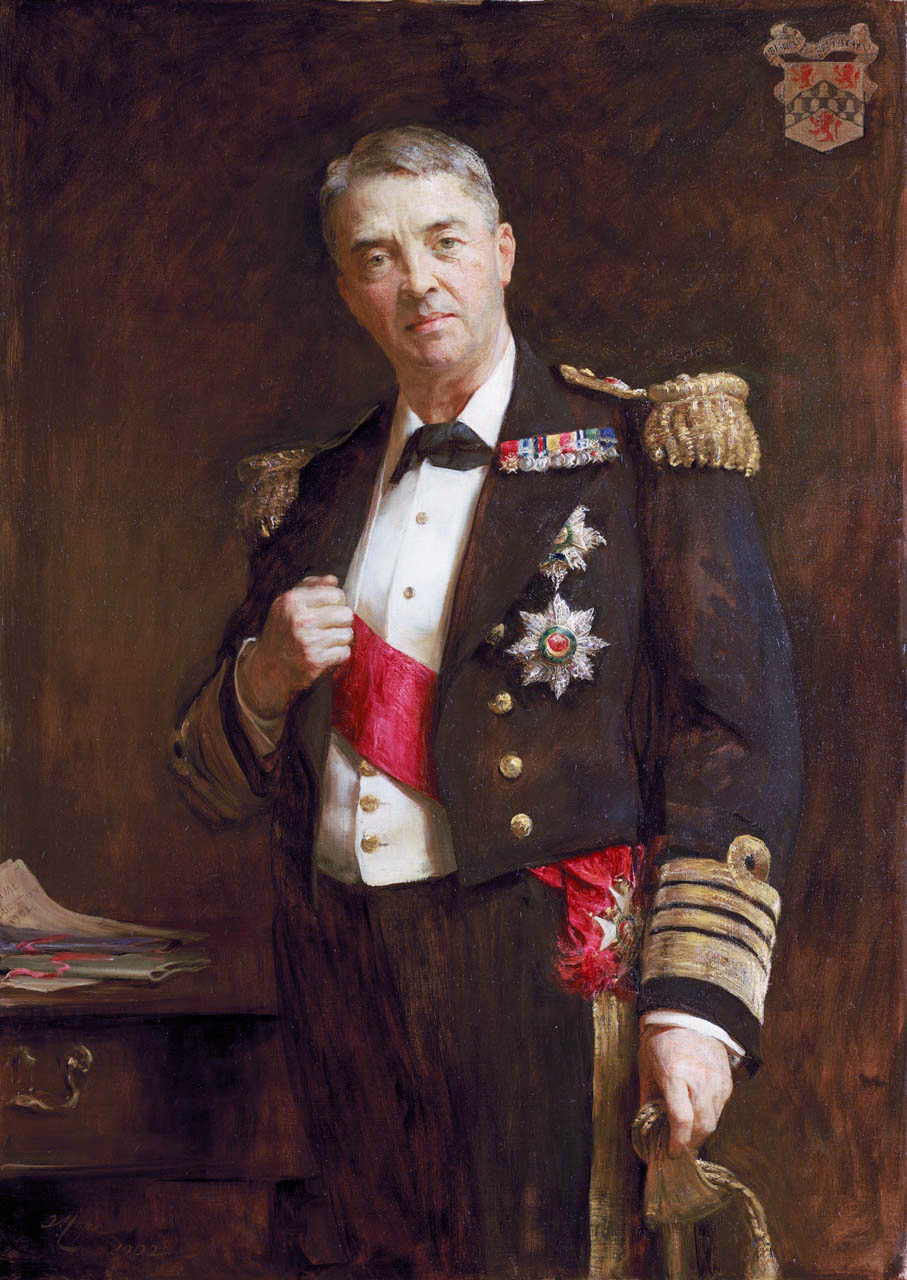
Portrait of John Fisher by Arthur Stockdale Cope

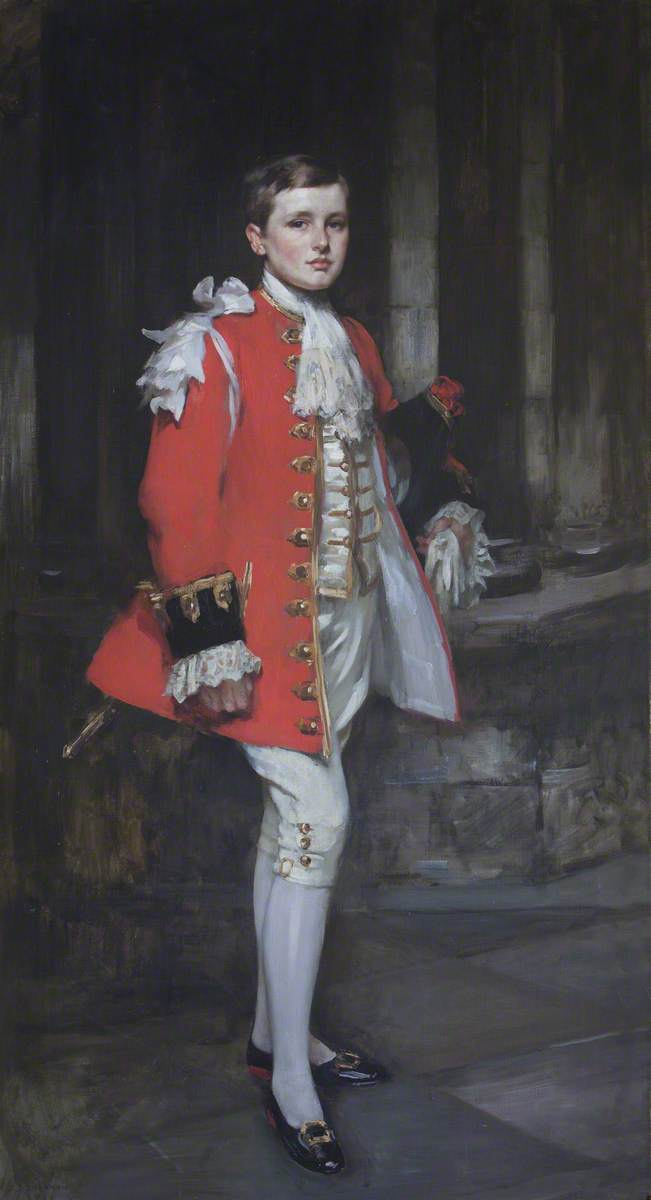
Portrait of George Venables-Vernon by James Jebusa Shannon

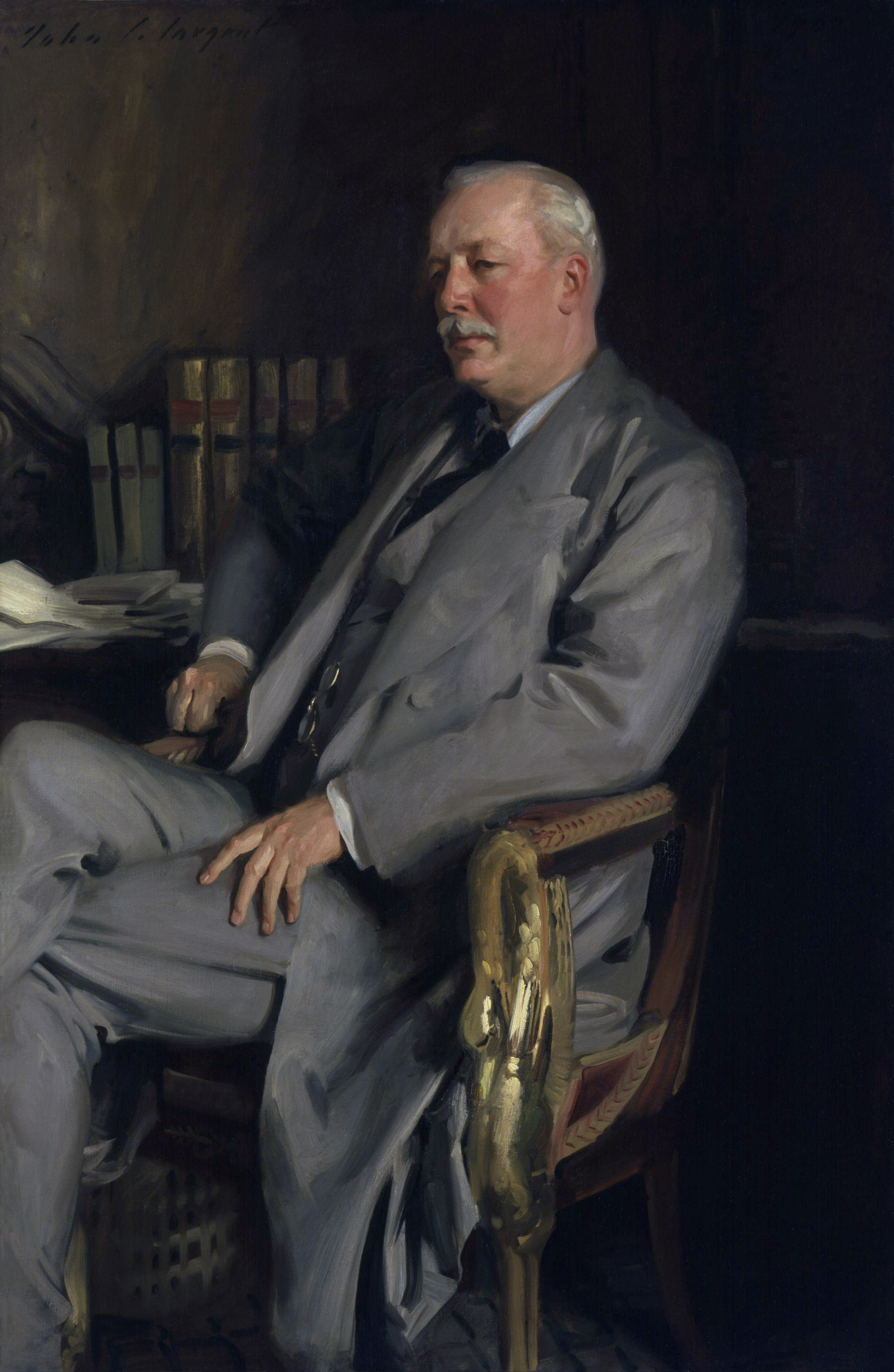
Portrait of the Earl of Cromer by John Singer Sargent

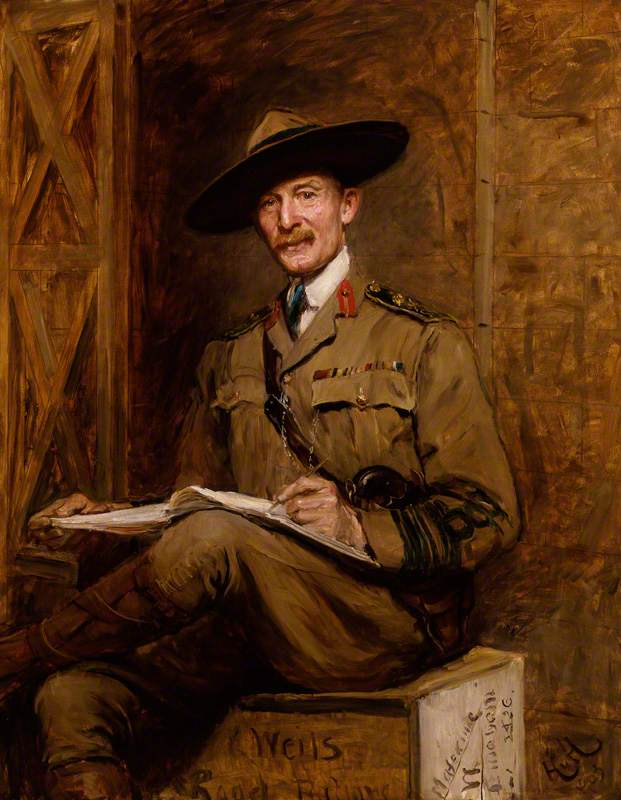
Portrait of Robert Baden-Powell by Hubert von Herkomer

Portrait of Clifford Probyn by Tennyson Cole

== See also ==
- Salon d'Automne, the inaugural edition of which was held in Paris the same year

== Bibliography ==
- Goodman, Jean. AJ: The Life of Alfred Munnings. Erskine Press, 2019.
- Harrington, Peter. British Artists and War: The Face of Battle in Paintings and Prints, 1700-1914. Greenhill Books, 1993.
- Lomax, James & Ormond, Richard. John Singer Sargent and the Edwardian Age. Leeds Art Galleries, 1979.
