= Alain Chartier (painting) =

1903 painting by Edmund Blair Leighton

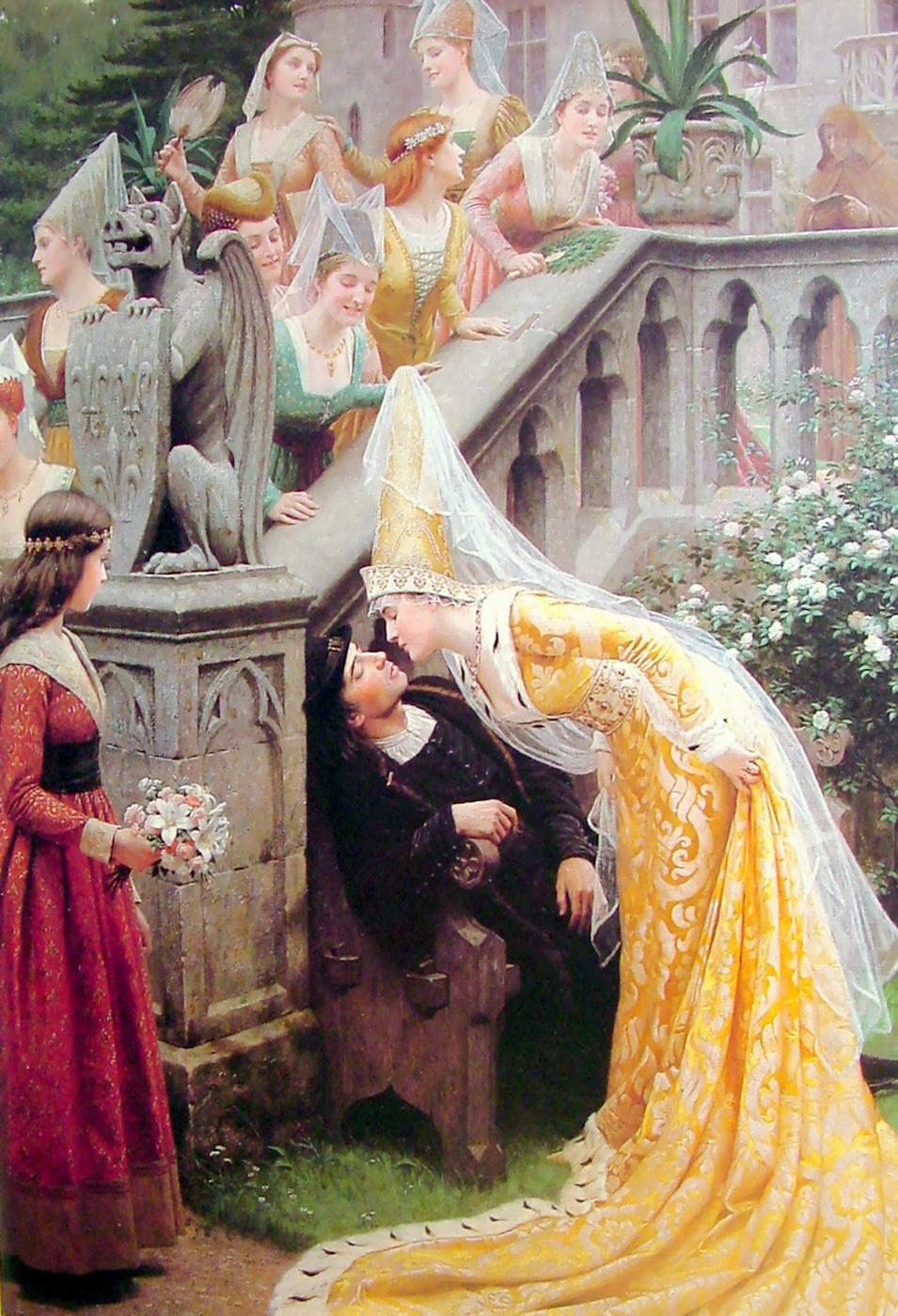
- Artist: Edmund Blair Leighton
- Year: 1903
- Medium: Oil on canvas
- Movement: Romanticism
- Dimensions: 161.3 cm × 111.8 cm (63.5 in × 44.0 in)
- Owner: Private collection

Alain Chartier is an oil on canvas painting by English artist Edmund Blair Leighton, from 1903. It depicts the poet Alain Cartier receiving a kiss from Margaret of Scotland, while he is sleeping.

The painting is also known by its inscription verso:

Margaret of Scotland, Dauphine of France, one day discovered Alain Chartier, the poet, asleep. In the presence of her attendants, she stopped and kissed his lips, saying, "Parce qu'elles avaient dit de si belles choses."

"Parce qu'elles avaient dit de si belles choses" translates to "Because they had said such beautiful things."

Alain Chartier debuted at the Royal Academy Exhibition of 1903. Royal Academy Notes published the following explanatory text: 'The Dauphine Margaret, eldest daughter of James I of Scotland kisses the poet's lips for the beautiful things they had said – "la praecieuse bouche de laquelle sont issus et sortis tant de bons mots et vertueses sentences"'.

== Description ==
The painting's setting is that of a medieval architectural style. The titular Alain Chartier is dressed in black and has fallen asleep in a chair beneath stone steps. Standing over him is a finely-dressed woman wearing a vibrant yellow surcote with fur lining, and a hennin, the so-named Margaret of Scotland; she leans over him about to or having just given him a kiss, holding her veil and train out of the way to not disturb the poet. A younger girl wearing a red dress holds a bouquet of flowers, standing on the left side of the painting as she watches the interaction. Crowding the stone steps leading down to the scene are many young women, perhaps Margaret's entourage, watching with various expressions of intrigue or delight, though some are unaware and only just noticing what is occurring. The ladies are all dressed in vibrant period clothing, indicating status and wealth while also contributing to the romantic atmosphere – they are a combination of married and unmarried women, marked by the difference in headwear. A brown-robed figure is further in the background, reading as he walks and unaware of what is happening below between the Dauphine and poet.

== Background ==
Alain Chartier was sketched the same year as The Secret (1885) and would have been painted then, but one of his uncles first gave him a commission to draw The Secret.

The inspiration for this painting's theme was the tale that Margaret of Scotland was kissed or almost kissed by poet Alain Chartier while asleep in her own rooms, though the vague dates known of Margaret and Chartier's lives mean that this story is likely a 19th century invention. Alain Chartier is an example of Leighton's common theme, romanticised historical narratives.

This painting reflects a late phase of the medieval revival in the Victorian era, which focused on romantic notions of chivalry and honour, impacting many asects of Victorian life such as art. The Christie's Lot Essay for Alain Chartier visually compares it to God Speed, another of Leighton's painting, because of "the prominence given to the balustraded stone steps, surmounted by griffins, and the concentration given to the medieval costumes."

== Provenance ==
Alain Chartier was bought by H.R. Hill from Christie's, London, on 4 February 1949. In February 1966, it was with The Leger Galleries in London. The painting sold anonymously for £22,000 from Sotheby's in London on 28 October 1982.

At Christie's during Live Auction 6520 which closed on 28 November 2001, Alain Chartier had an estimated value GBP 300,000–500,000 and sold for GBP 311,750 to join a private collection.
