= The Prodigal Daughter (painting) =

Painting by John Collier

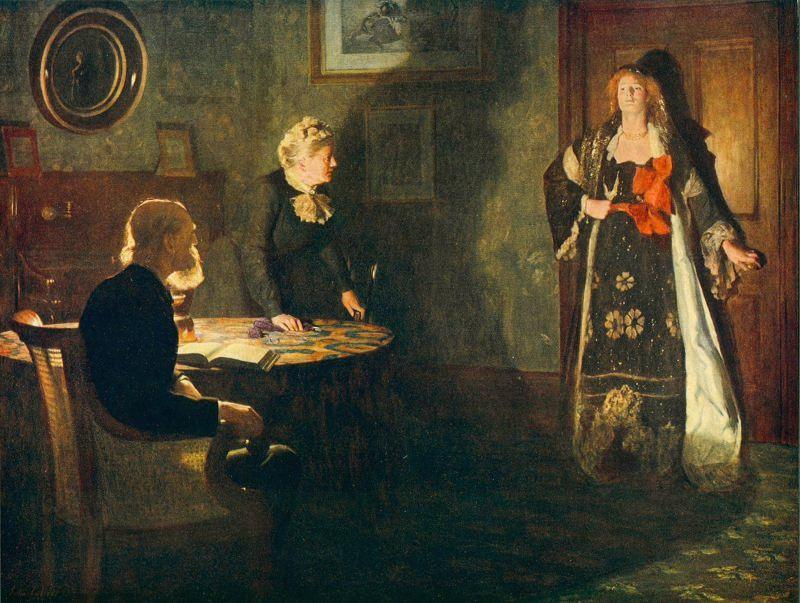
- Artist: John Collier
- Year: 1903
- Type: Oil on canvas, genre painting
- Dimensions: 166 cm × 217 cm (65 in × 85 in)
- Location: Usher Gallery, Lincoln

The Prodigal Daughter is a 1903 oil painting by the British artist John Collier. It shows a flashily dressed young woman returning home to her respectable, elderly parents late in the evening. Collier enjoyed success in the Edwardian era with "problem pictures" such as this whose meaning was far from obvious. It is ambiguous whether she has been working as an actress, a prostitute or simply been living a bohemian lifestyle. The title makes reference to the biblical story of the Prodigal Son which involves parental forgiveness. However the woman's stance suggests she is proudly unrepentant.

The painting was displayed at the Royal Academy Exhibition of 1903 held at Burlington House in London . Today it is part of the collection of the Usher Gallery in Lincoln, having been presented by the artist's widow in 1935.

== Bibliography ==
- Hadjiafxendi, Kyriaki & Zakreski, Patricia. Crafting the Woman Professional in the Long Nineteenth Century. Taylor & Francis, 2016.
- Kestner, Joseph A. Masculinities in Victorian Painting. Scolar Press, 1985.
- Pollock, Walter Herries. The Art of John Collier. Virtue & Company, 1914.
