= Echo and Narcissus (Waterhouse painting) =

Painting by John William Waterhouse

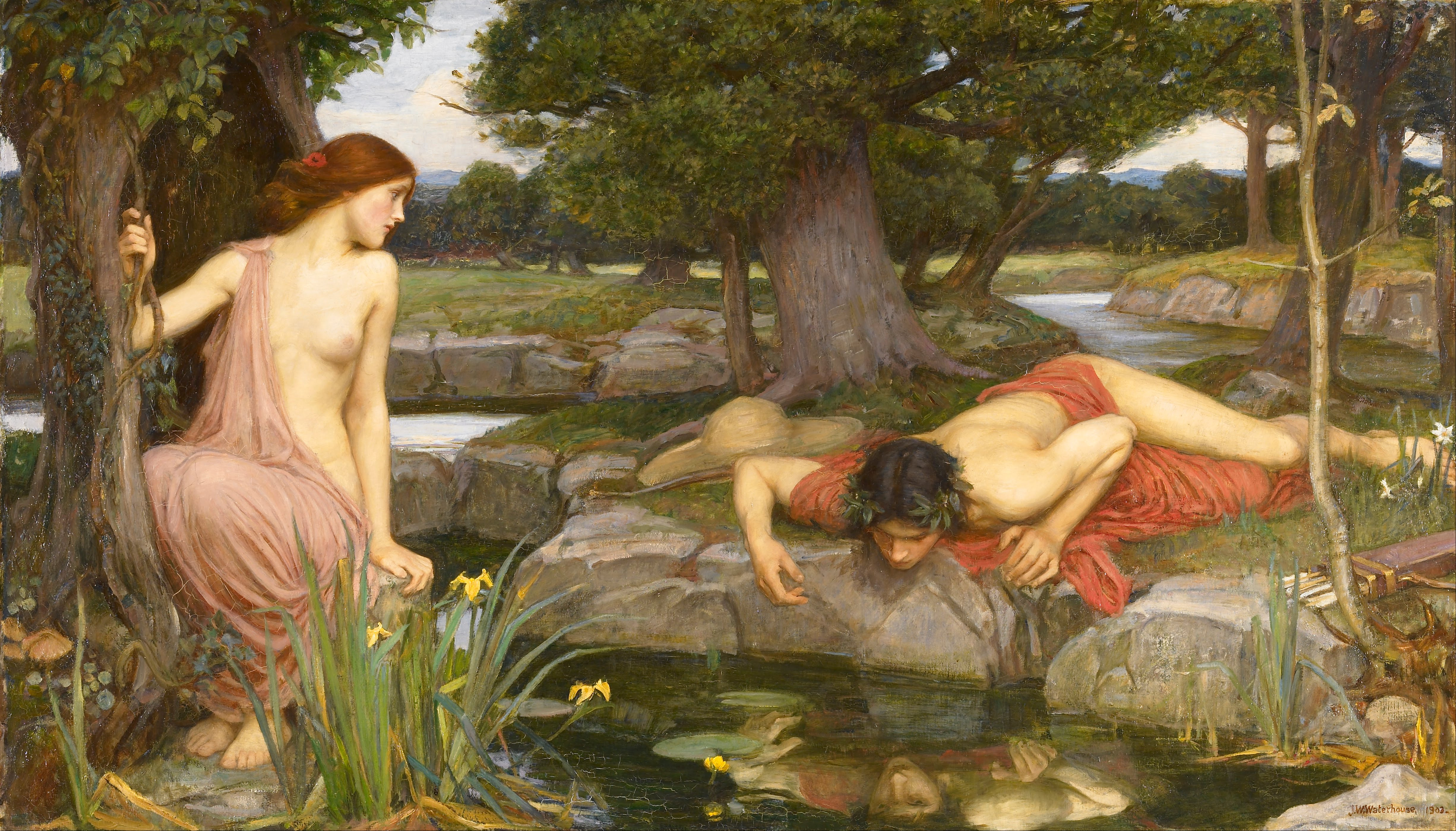
- Artist: John William Waterhouse
- Year: 1903
- Medium: Oil on canvas
- Dimensions: 109.2 cm × 189.2 cm (43 in × 74 in)
- Location: Walker Art Gallery, Liverpool

Echo and Narcissus is a 1903 oil painting by John William Waterhouse. It illustrates the myth of Echo and Narcissus from Ovid's Metamorphoses.

John William Waterhouse (1847–1917) was an English painter who, because of his style and themes, is generally classified as a Pre-Raphaelite. He painted over 200 works, mainly in the genres of classical mythology, and of historical or literary subjects. One of his common themes is the femme fatale, the woman who ensnares a man.

In Ovid's version of the myth, Narcissus was the beautiful son of the river god Cephissus and the nymph Liriope. His parents were told that he would live to an old age if he did not look at himself. He rejected all the nymphs and women who fell in love with him. One of these was the nymph Echo, who could only repeat the words of others. She was so upset by her rejection that she withdrew from life and wasted away until all that was left was a whisper. Her prayers were heard by the goddess Nemesis who caused Narcissus to fall in love with his own reflection in a pool of water. He continued to look at his reflection until he died. A narcissus flower grew on the spot where he died.

The painting is set in an idyllic wooded landscape beside a stream with rocky edges. The young Narcissus is lying prone, with his head over the water, fascinated by his own reflection. He is half-clad in a red robe, symbolising his flaming self-desire. The nymph Echo sits nearby across the stream, clasping a tree with her right hand, gazing at Narcissus in despair. She is symbolically separated from Narcissus, who does not look back towards her. Her cramped posture reflects her unrequited love. She is wearing a pink robe that has fallen off the left shoulder to reveal one breast; the milder pink of her robe reflects less passionate, smouldering love for Narcissus. Near her grow some yellow flag irises, Iris pseudacorus, and she wears a red poppy in her auburn hair. Some white narcissi have emerged from the grass beside the youth's foot, and a yellow water lily, Nuphar lutea, is in the water.

The painting is in oils on canvas and it measures 109.2 cm × 189.2 cm (43.0 in × 74.5 in). It was exhibited at the Royal Academy's Summer Exhibition of 1903. It forms part of the Victorian collection in the Walker Art Gallery in Liverpool, Merseyside, England, having been purchased by the museum in 1903.

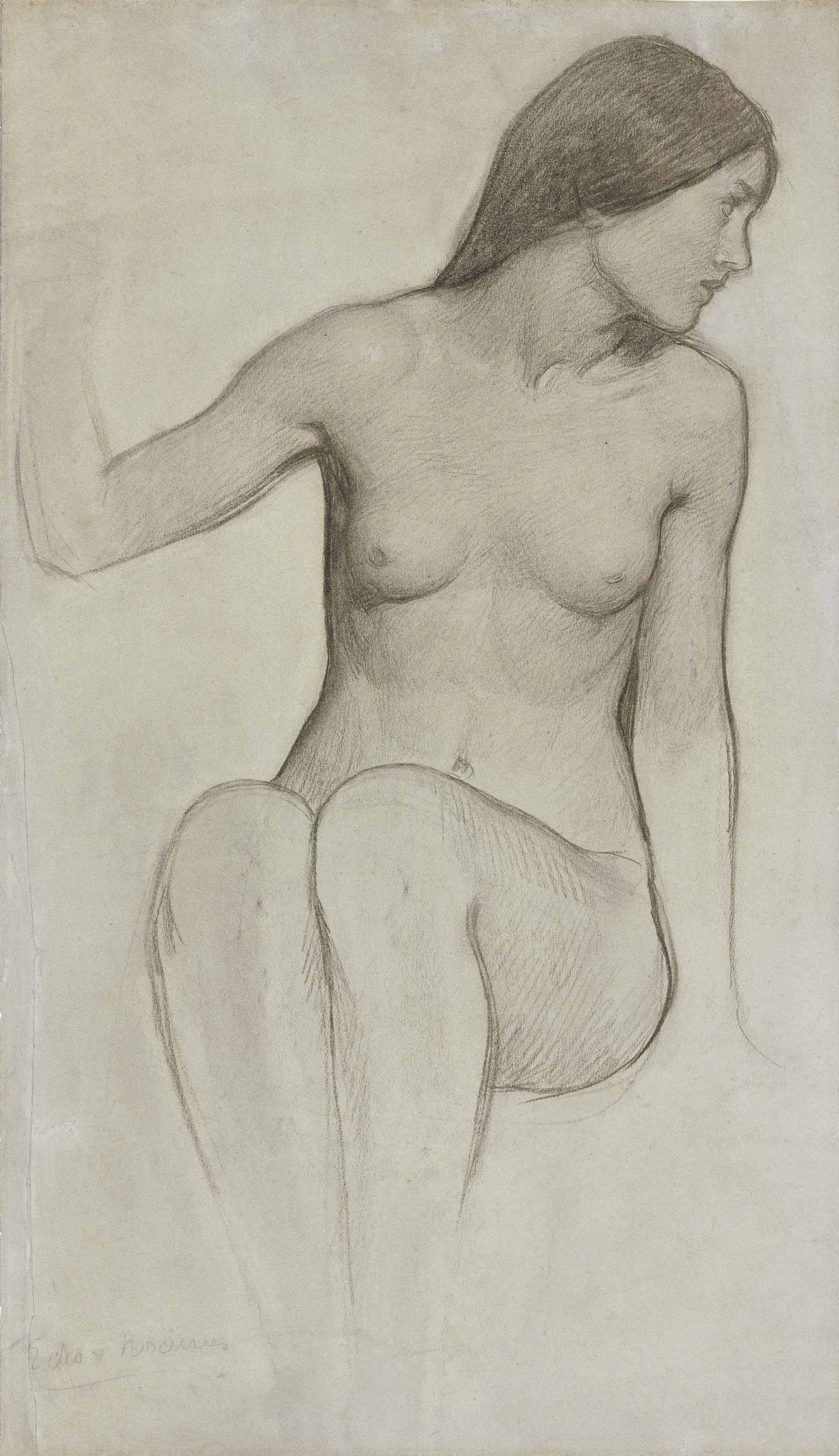
Study for Echo, c. 1903

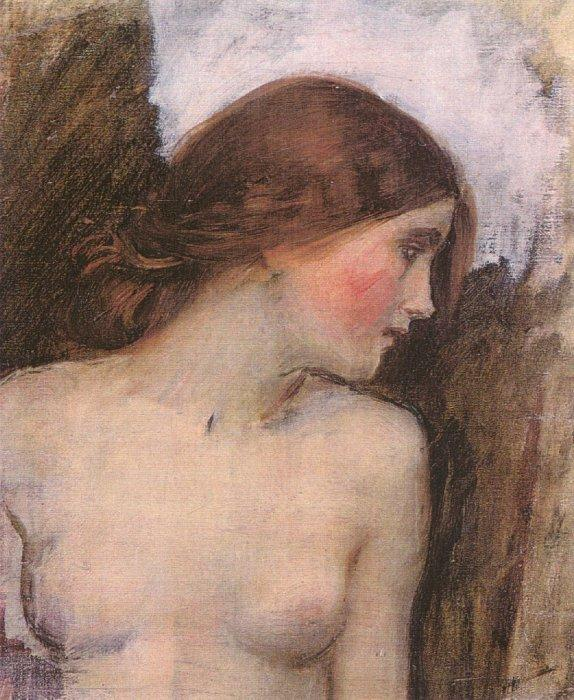
Study for Echo, c. 1903

== See also ==
- List of paintings by John William Waterhouse
