= Rêve de printemps =

1901 painting by William-Adolphe Bouguereau

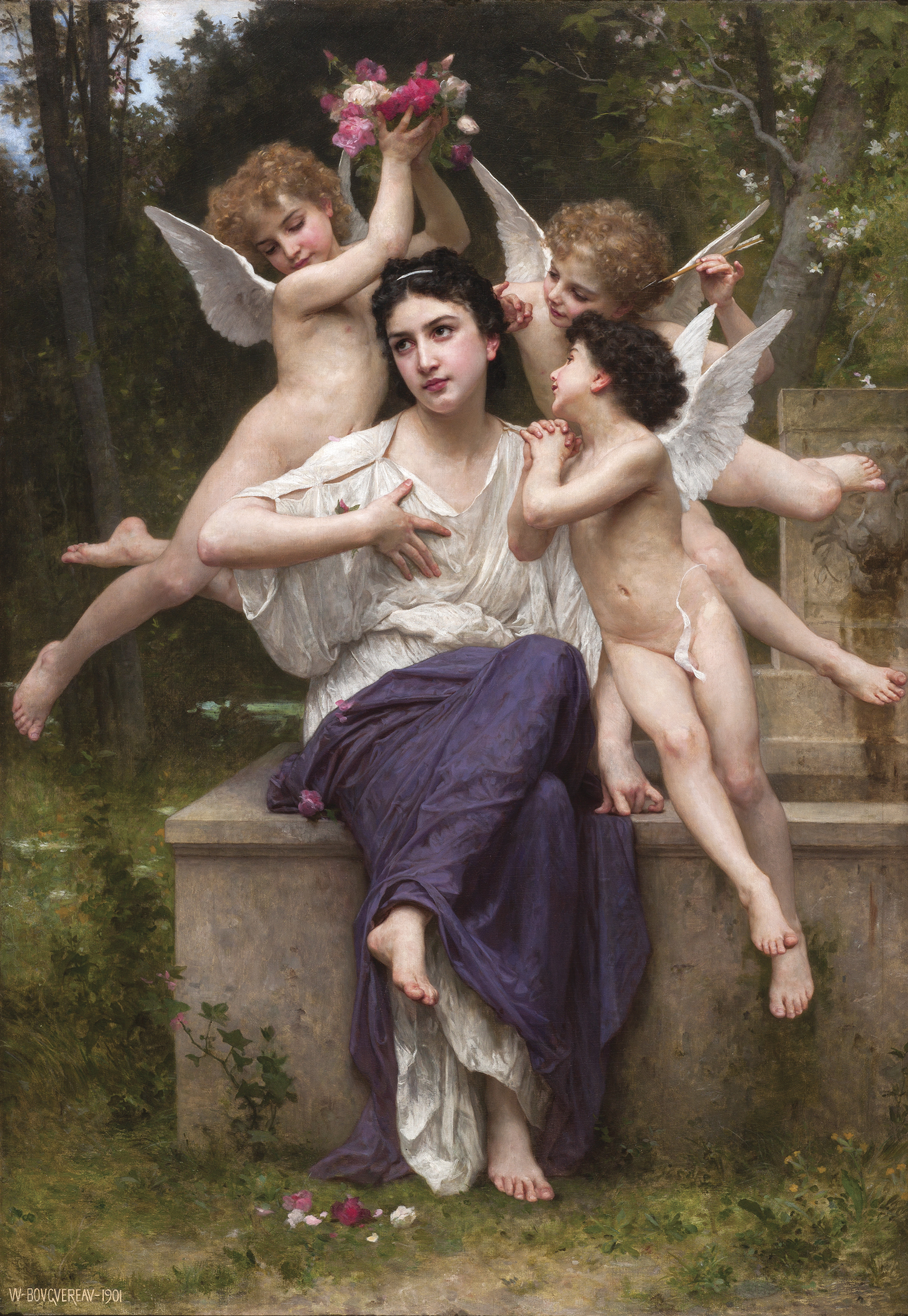
- Artist: William-Adolphe Bouguereau
- Year: 1901
- Medium: Oil on canvas
- Dimensions: 190 cm × 130 cm (73 in × 50 in)
- Location: Indianapolis Museum of Art

Rêve de printemps (transl. Dream of Spring) is a 1901 painting by the French painter William-Adolphe Bouguereau. The painting is an allegory of spring, it shows a young woman sitting in a forest surrounded by three small amores who crown her with a wreath of spring flowers as déesse du printemps. The painting was displayed at the Royal Academy Exhibition of 1903 held at Burlington House in London under the shorter title Printemps. It was owned at the time by the art dealers Arthur Tooth & Sons. It is now in the collection of the Indianapolis Museum of Art.

== See also ==
- William-Adolphe Bouguereau gallery
