= Lewis Waller as Monsieur Beaucaire =

Painting by John Collier

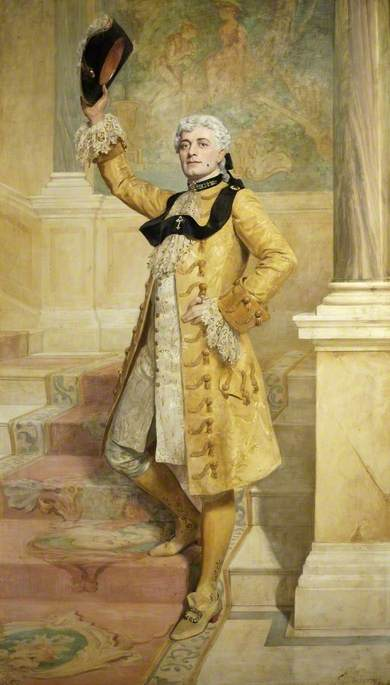
- Artist: John Collier
- Year: 1903
- Type: Oil on canvas, portrait painting
- Dimensions: 236 cm × 134.5 cm (93 in × 53.0 in)
- Location: Russell-Cotes Art Gallery, Bournemouth

Lewis Waller as Monsieur Beaucaire is a 1903 portrait painting by the British artist John Collier. It depicts the actor Lewis Waller in costume for the title part of the play Monsieur Beaucaire, based on the 1900 novel of the same title by Booth Tarkington. It was a major hit for Waller when it appeared at the Comedy Theatre in the West End in 1902.

The painting was displayed at the Royal Academy Exhibition of 1903 held at Burlington House in London. The picture is now in the collection of the Russell-Cotes Art Gallery in Bournemouth having been gifted by Merton Russell-Cotes in 1921, who acquired it in a 1915 sale of Waller's belongings.

== Bibliography ==
- Pollock, Walter Herries. The Art of John Collier. Virtue & Company, 191e.
