= The Cave of the Storm Nymphs =

Painting by Edward Poynter

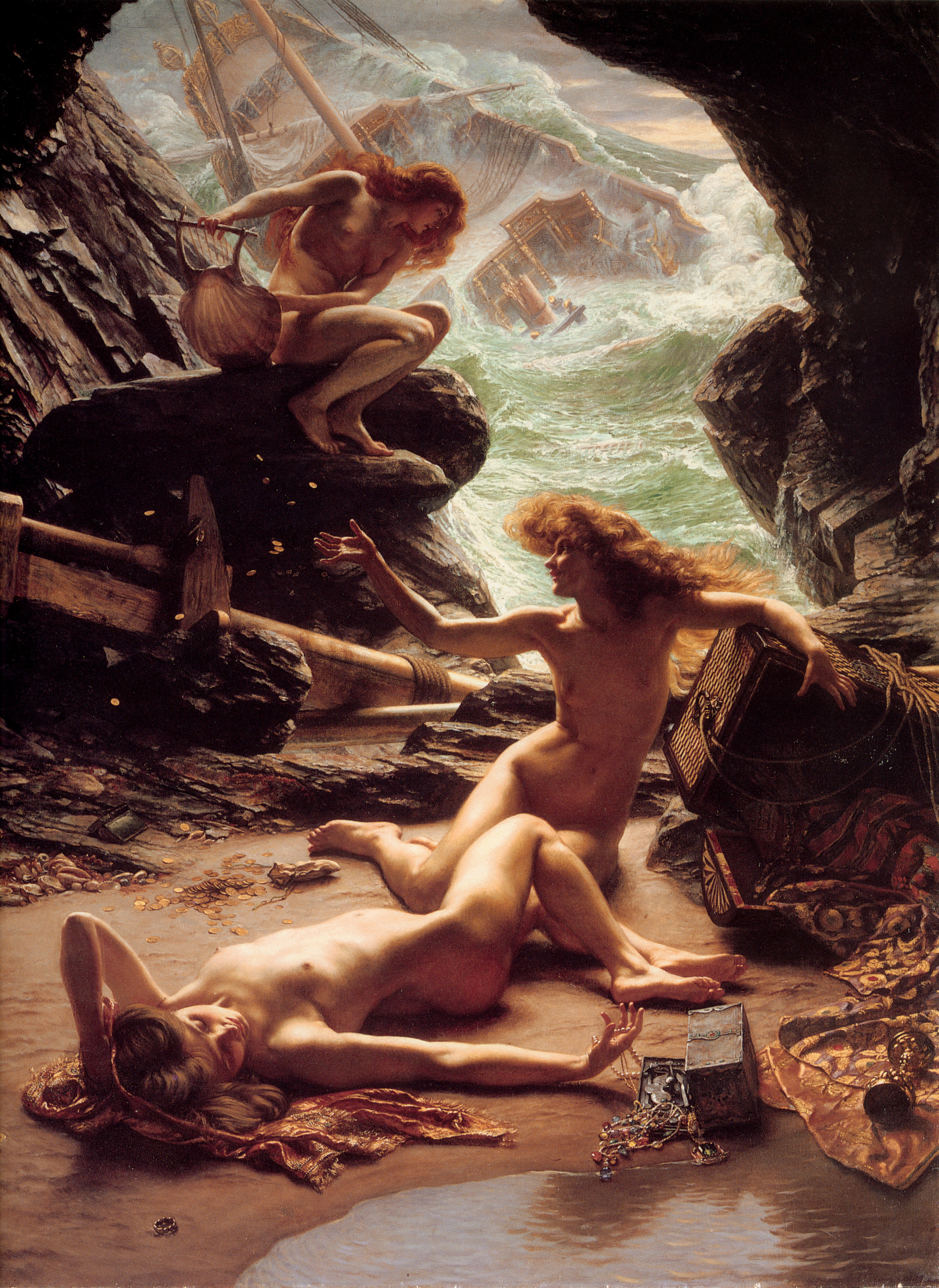
- Artist: Edward Poynter
- Year: 1902 (first version), 1903 (second version)
- Medium: Oil on canvas
- Dimensions: 145.9 cm × 110.4 cm (57.4 in × 43.5 in)
- Location: Norfolk Hermitage Museum (1902 version), private collection (1903 version)

The Cave of the Storm Nymphs is a painting by British artist Edward Poynter, depicting three nude sirens or nymphs from Greek mythology that lure sailors to their deaths. Poynter painted two versions, one in 1902 and the other in 1903, with minor differences. The former is housed in the Norfolk, Virginia Hermitage Museum, and the latter is in the private collection of Sir Andrew Lloyd Webber. One of the depicted sirens is playing a golden stringed, scallop-shell lyre, while the other two rejoice amid a foundering ship, expecting to add to the cave’s treasure.

In 1901, Poynter drew a preparatory study for the painting, housed in the National Gallery of Canada. The study was donated to the National Gallery of Canada by the Dennis T. Lanigan Collection in 2007. The painting was displayed at the Royal Academy Exhibition of 1903 at Burlington House in London.
