= Ernest Waterlow =

English landscape artist

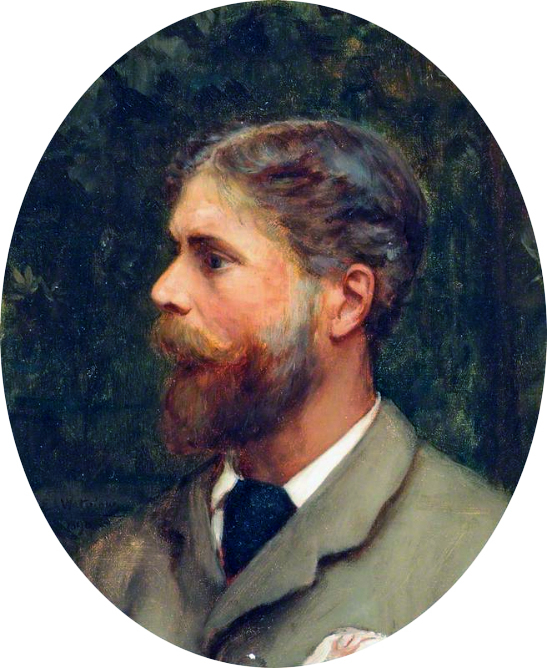
Self-portrait (1890)

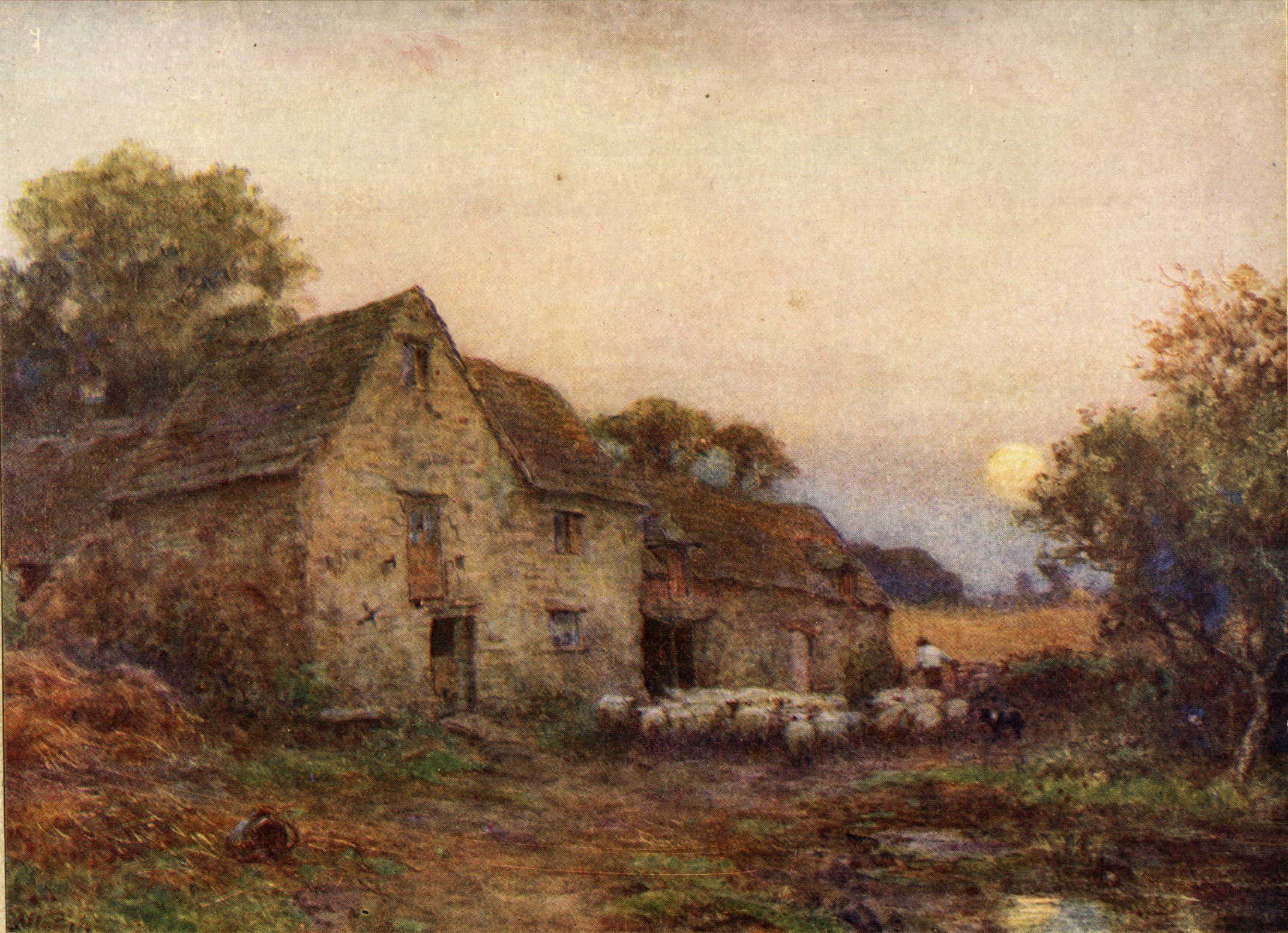
The Harvest Moon by Ernest Albert Waterlow

Sir Ernest Albert Waterlow, RA ROI (24 May 1850 – 25 October 1919) was a British painter.

== Biography ==
Waterlow was born in London, and received the main part of his art education in the Royal Academy schools, where, in 1873, he gained the Turner medal for landscape painting. Sir Sydney Waterlow was his uncle.

He was elected associate of the Royal Watercolour Society in 1880, member in 1894, and president in 1897; associate of the Royal Academy in 1890, and academician in 1903.

Waterlow obtained a passport signed by Earl Granville, Foreign Secretary in 1871 to travel to the continent including Warsaw

He began to exhibit in 1872 and produced a considerable number of admirable landscapes, in oil and watercolour, handled with grace and distinction. One of his pictures, Galway Gossips, is in the Tate collection.

He was knighted in the 1902 Coronation Honours, receiving the accolade from King Edward VII at Buckingham Palace on 24 October that year.

Waterlow died in Hampstead in 1919.

== Family ==
Waterlow's sister Constance was married to the neurologist David Ferrier; Waterlow illustrated several of Ferrier's scientific papers.
