= Reality (Jacek Malczewski) =

1908 painting by Jacek Malczewski

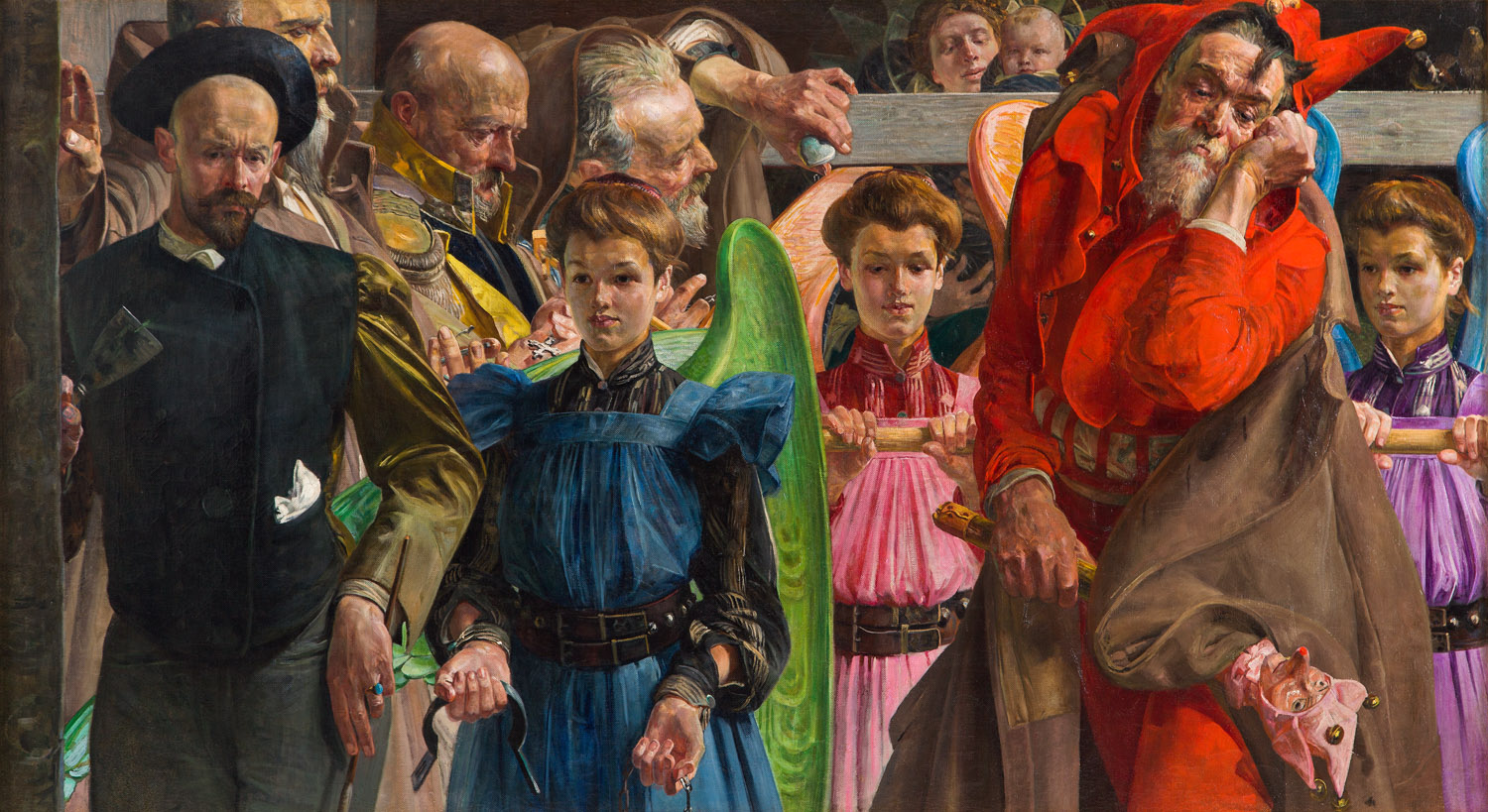
- Artist: Jacek Malczewski
- Year: 1908
- Medium: Oil on canvas
- Movement: Symbolism
- Dimensions: 115 cm × 209 cm (45 in × 82 in)

Reality (Polish: Rzeczywistość) is an oil-on-canvas painting by the Polish Symbolist painter Jacek Malczewski. The painting was completed in 1908 and is considered among the most notable works in the artist's oeuvre.

== Description ==
The painting measures 115 cm by 209 cm and depicts a Nativity scene in which ten figures are presented: Virgin Mary, Christ Child, three angels, three 19th-century Polish insurrectionists, Stańczyk and Malczewski himself. The composition is dominated by vivid colours.

== History and analysis ==
The painting was created by Malczewski in 1908. In 1910, it was reproduced in an album of Malczewski's works issued by the Polish Painters Salon in Kraków, which testifies to the early recognition and importance of this work in the artist's output. In 1914, Reality was presented in Tygodnik Illustrowany weekly. The painting was last seen in public in 1926 at an exhibition in Lwów (now Lviv, Ukraine).

For almost a century, its later whereabouts were unknown. In 2021, the artwork was rediscovered in a private collection of Polish and German art and acquired by DESA Unicum auction house. The re-emergence of the painting is viewed as an important event in Polish art history due to the fact that Reality is counted among the most significant symbolist works by Malczewski in which the painter touches upon the theme of the vocation of the artist, patriotic role of art as well as romantic and national myths, similarly to his Vicious Circle or Melancholia.

The painting can be interpreted as the artist's powerful, symbolist vision of the history of post-partition Poland. The composition includes participants of Polish national uprisings in the 19th century representing three generations. They symbolise the martydom of the nation under foreign rule. In the painting Malczewski decided to depict the royal jester Stańczyk holding a Caduceus and looking at the insurrectionists with deep compassion. On the left, the artist represented himself as a pensive figure with a prophetic look in his eyes. The title of the artwork alludes to the painter's extrasensory and psychic reality, the inner world of his inspirations resulting from his Romantic worldview, deep religiousness and personal attachment to patriotic myths.

== Art market ==
In November 2022, Malczewski's Reality was sold at DESA Unicum auction house in Warsaw for 17 million zlotys (€3.6 million) setting a new record for the most expensive painting sold on the Polish art market. However, the sale of the piece remains on hold after doubts were raised about the legal status of this property as the National Museum in Warsaw claims ownership of the work of art. The Polish Ministry of Culture and National Heritage reported to the police authorities that the painting could have been illegally taken from Poland in the 1950s.

== See also ==
- Symbolism (arts)
- Young Poland
- List of Polish painters
- History of Poland (1795–1918)
