= Maria Bal =

Polish baroness and artistic muse

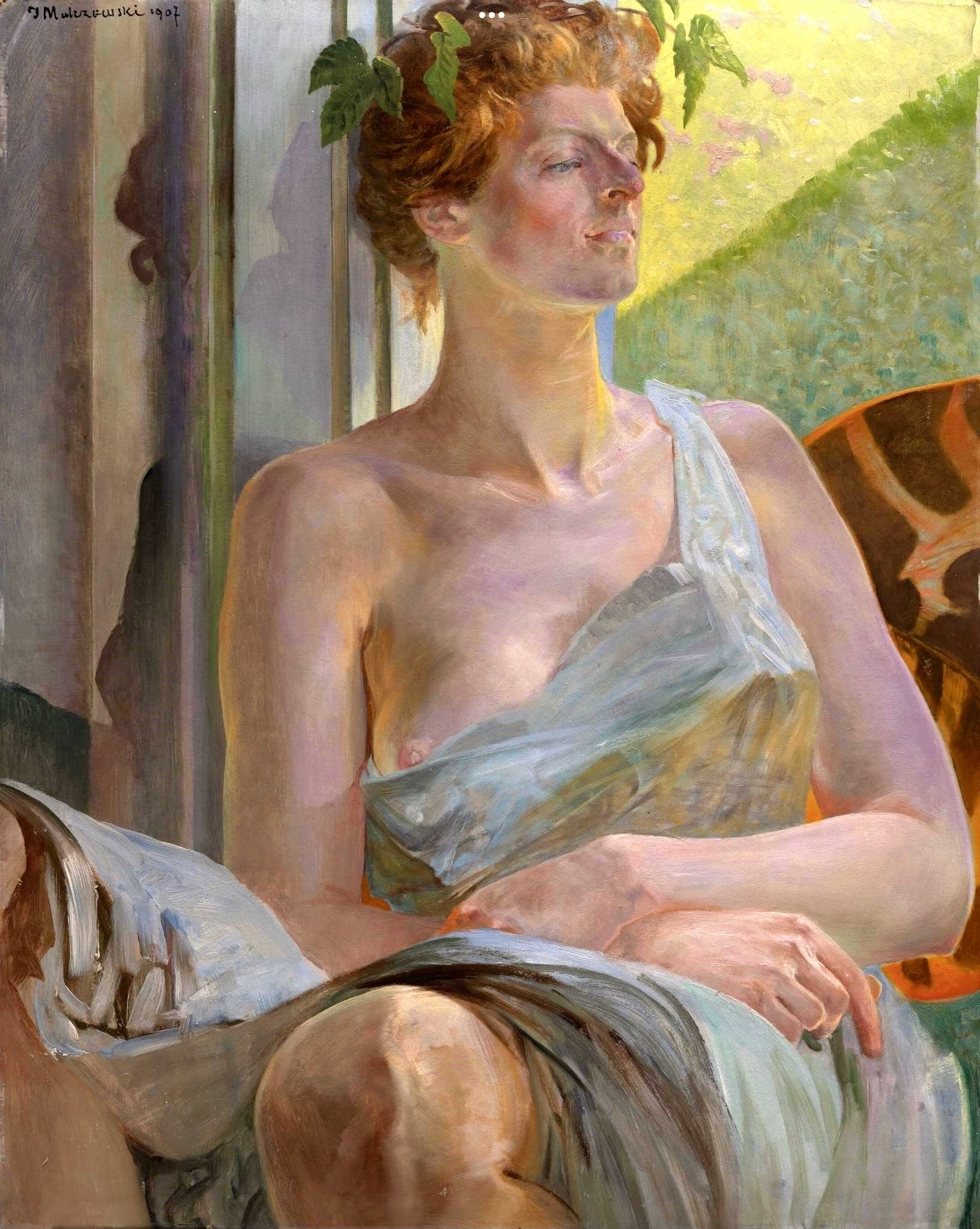
- Bacchante, portrait of Maria Balowa by Jacek Malczewski, 1907
- Born: Maria Brunicka; 26 July 1879; Zalishchyky
- Died: 1 January 1955 (aged 75); Kraków
- Known for: Painting
- Movement: Symbolism
- Spouse: Stanisław Bal

Jadwiga Maria Kinga Bal (Balowa) of Zaleszczyki, née Brunicka (26 July 1879 – 1 January 1955) was a Polish baroness and a lifelong muse of Jacek Malczewski, considered Poland's national painter. She served as the live model for a series of his symbolic portrayals of women, as well as nude studies and mythological beings. Most were completed before the interwar period when Poland had not yet achieved independence.

== Early life and education ==
Jadwiga Maria Brunicka (called Maria) was born during the foreign Partitions of Poland to baron Seweryn Brunicki, a Polish land-owner, and his wife Jadwiga Maria Kryspina Zagórska, (see the Ostoja coat of arms) at their country estate in Zaleszczyki (now Zalischyky, western Ukraine). A descendant of a Jewish family from Bavaria, her father carried the title of baron received in 1813. The family owned a tenement house in the metropolitan city of Kraków at ul. Pierackiego 7, where Maria later was a frequent visitor.

Maria was noted as being exceptionally beautiful by her family. They called her Kinga from the time she was a girl. As was typical of wealthy families, she was educated at home by a tutor.

== Marriage and family ==
In 1898 Maria Brunicka married Stanisław Jakub Bal, a land-owner who was nine years older. The main residence of the Bal family was an estate in Tuligłowy, in eastern Poland. The house had been rebuilt in the early 19th century. They had two daughters together. Their marriage ended about 1904. One of their daughters, Helena Bal (1904–1996), became a painter in the interwar period.

From about 1904 to the outbreak of World War I, Maria had an affair with the painter Jacek Malczewski who was 25 years her senior; elected Rector of the Academy of Fine Arts in 1912. They remained friends after she broke up with him, and frequently corresponded during her foreign travels. In 1923 she married again, this time to a Jerzy Turno, (see the Kotwica coat of arms). Malczewski was among the prominent guests at her wedding.

== Muse and model ==
Maria Bal had met the artist Jacek Malczewski around 1904 while living in Kraków, after her first marriage had come to an end. They had a tumultuous affair that lasted until World War I. She posed for many of his symbolic paintings from the Pythia series painted at the cusp of Poland's return to independence (before the end of the war). These works included his numerous self-portraits with muses. Malczewski was a married man. He had a son, Rafał born in 1892, who also became a painter later on.

Maria Bal was a star of the local literary society in Kraków. She was also a regular at the gatherings of artists held at the Kraków mansion of Olga Chwistkowa. After breaking up with Malczewski, Maria remained friends with him. They frequently corresponded before her second marriage.

Maria is one of the most revered art models in Poland. She died on 3 January 1955 in Kraków at the age of 75. A black dress of hers, from the 1930s, is on display at the Department of Fashion in the Central Museum of Textiles in Łódź.

== Selected depictions of Maria by Malczewski ==
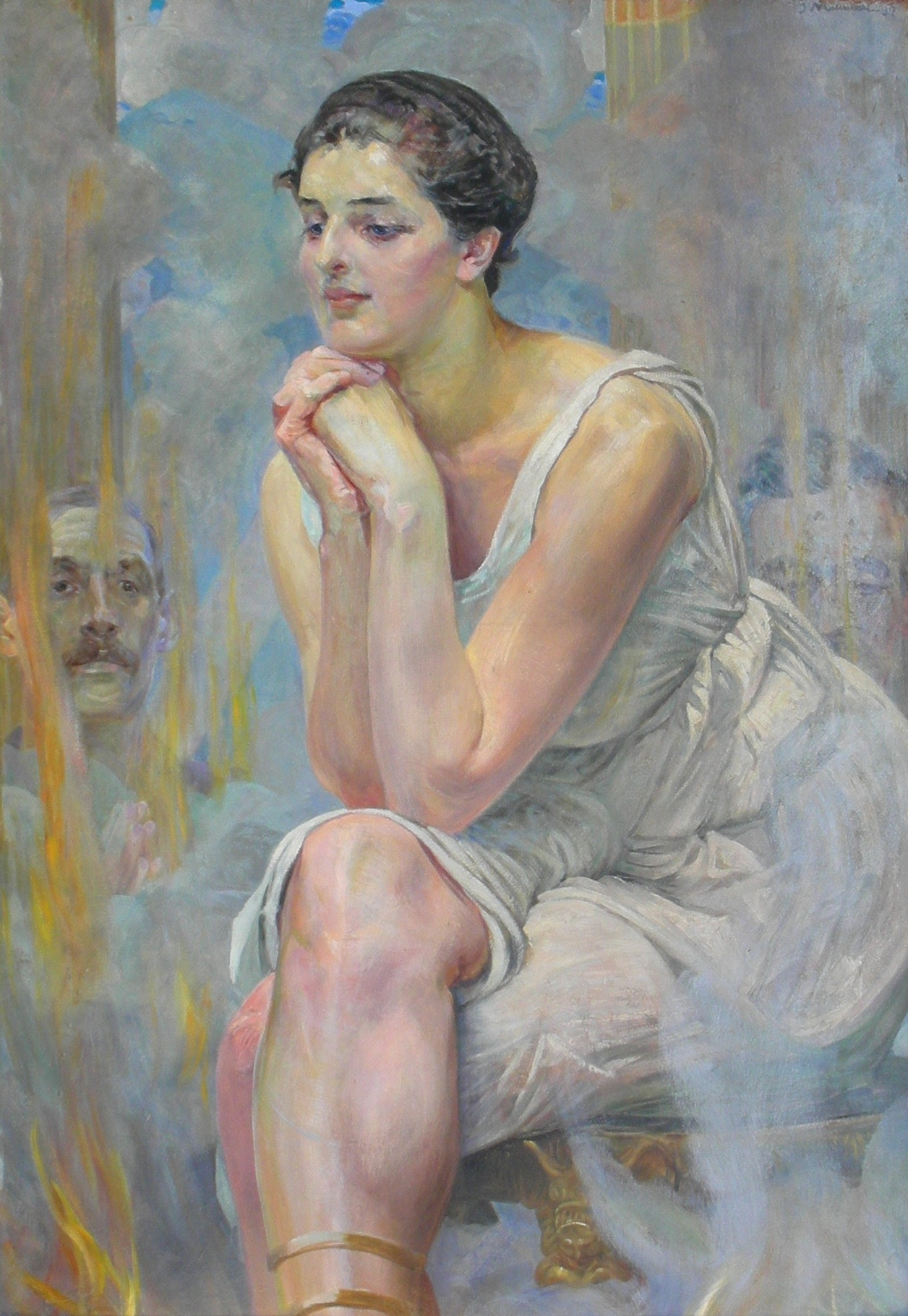
Pythia

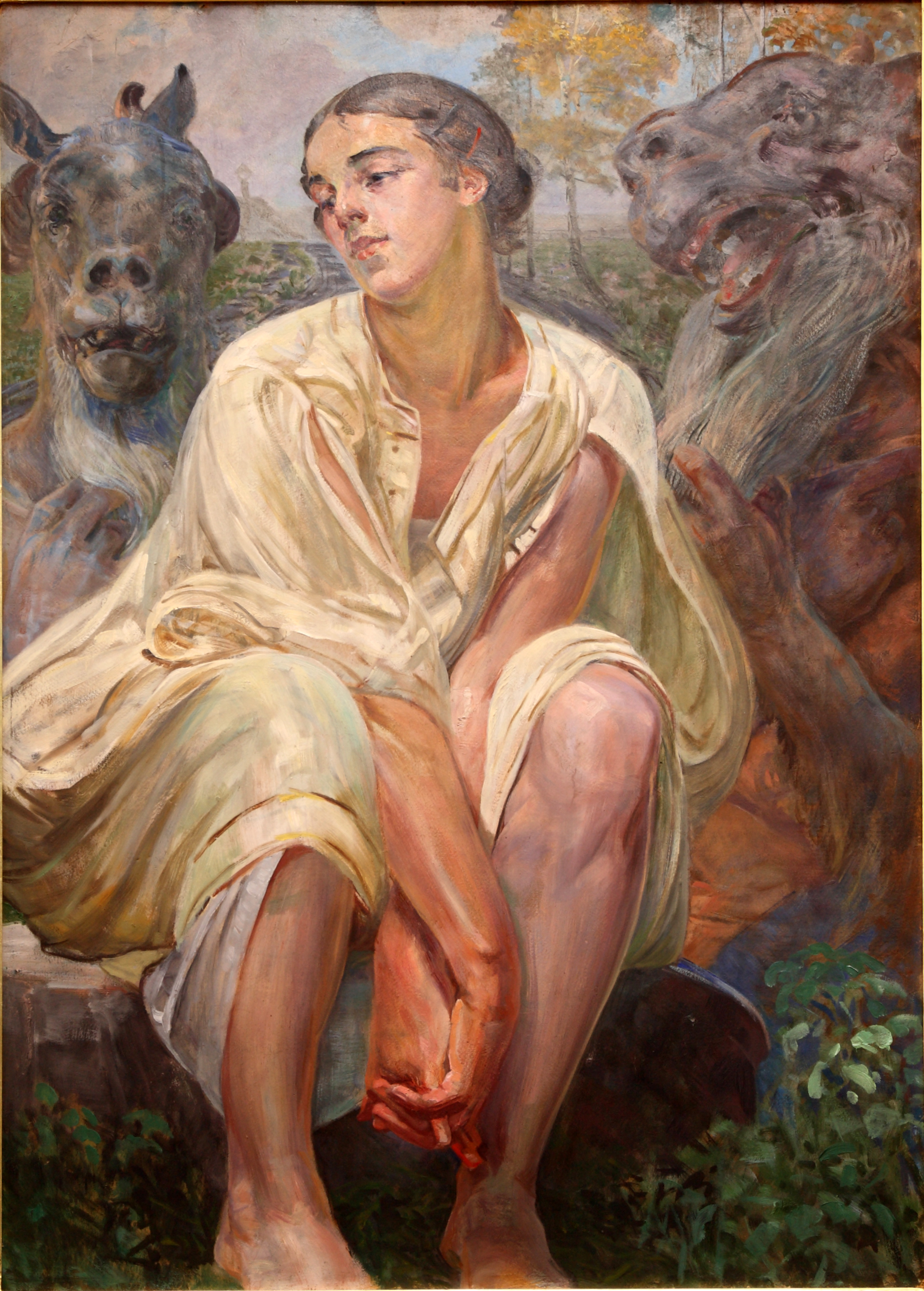
Enslavement

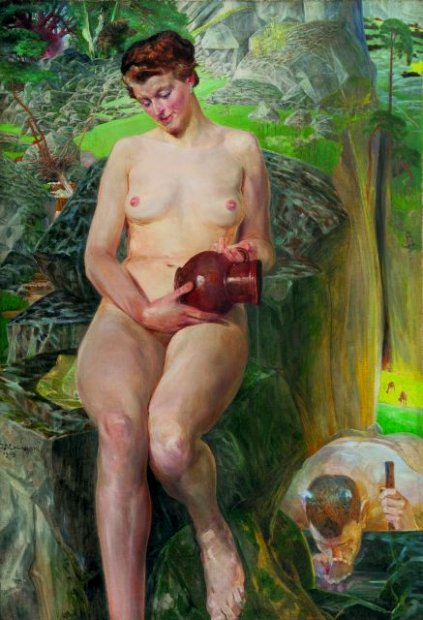
At the Source

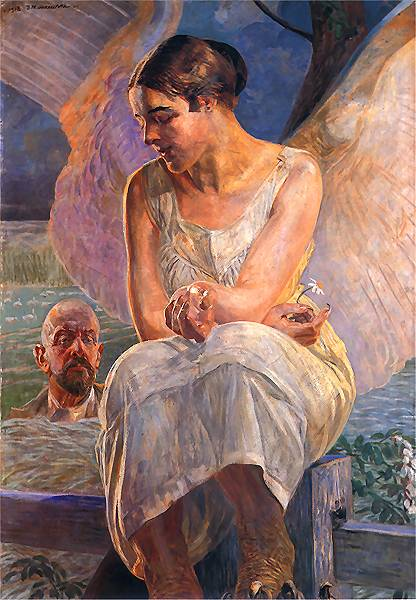
Intermezzo

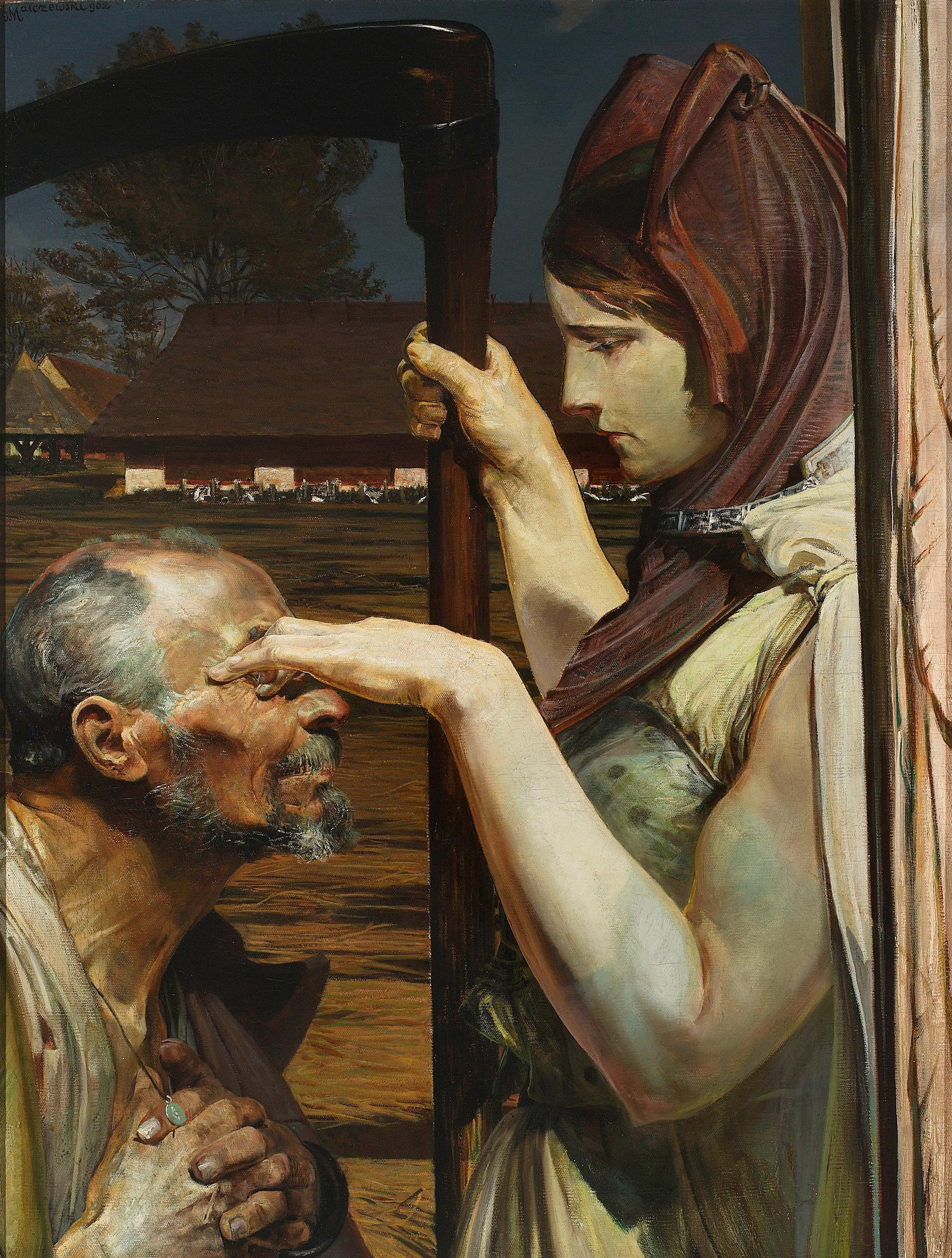
Angel of Death
Maria Bal as Poland's national symbol
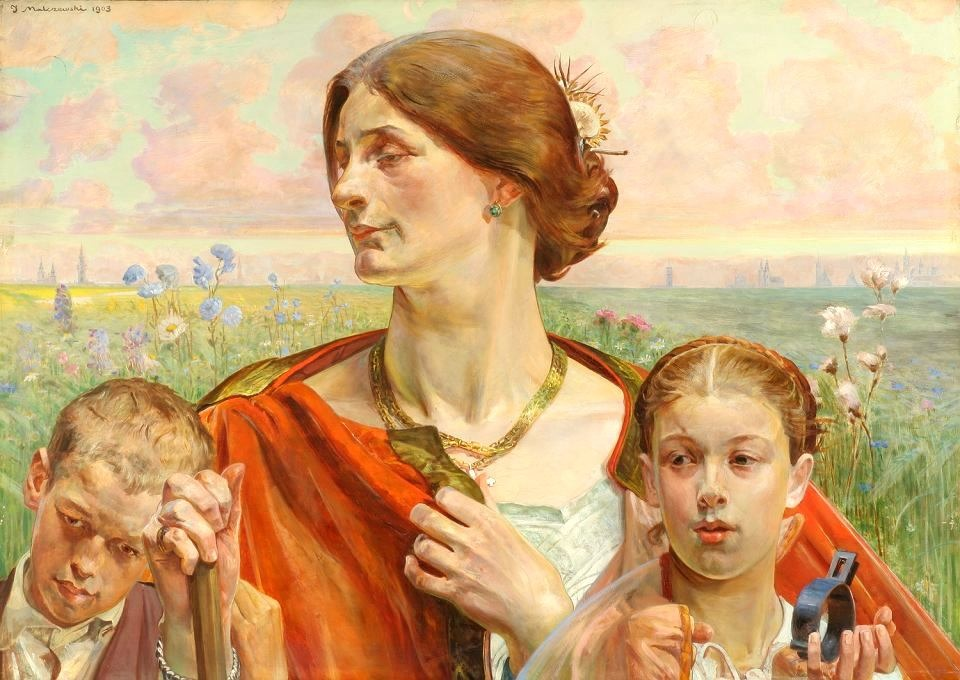
Motherland

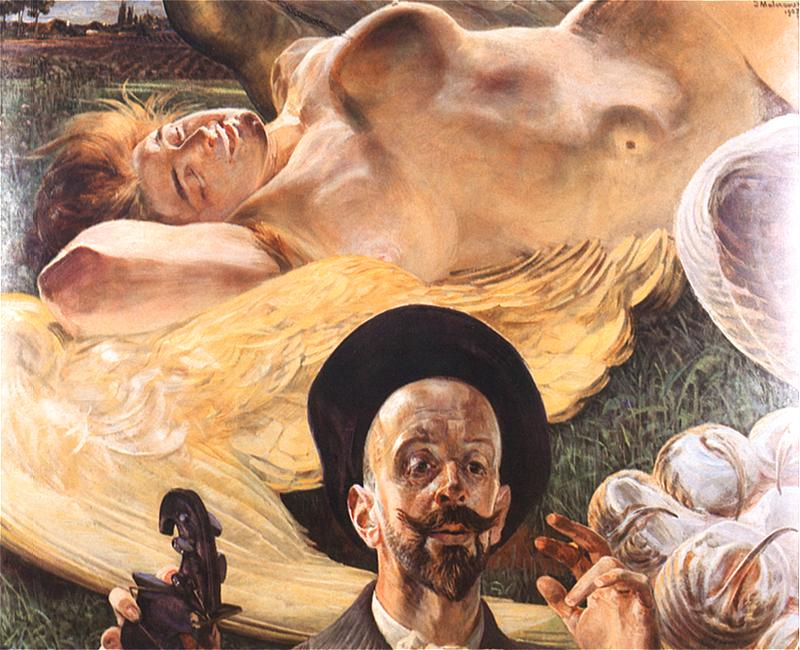
Sleeping Harpy

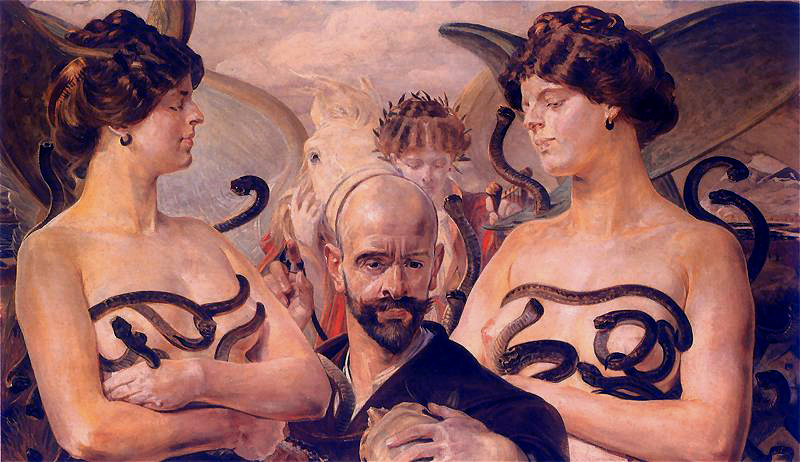
Finis Poloniae (double portrait)

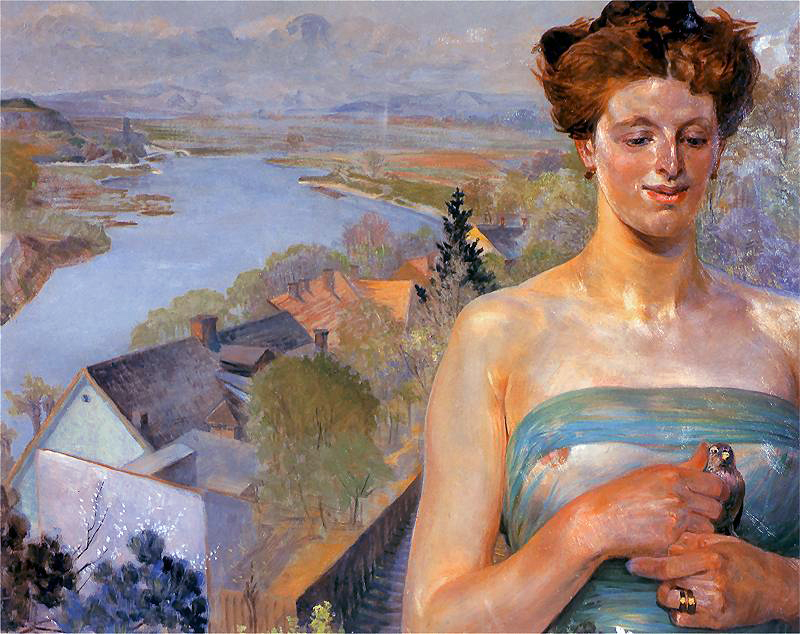
The Spring

== Notes and references ==
- Media related to Maria Bal at Wikimedia Commons
