= Jacek Malczewski =

Polish painter (1854–1929)

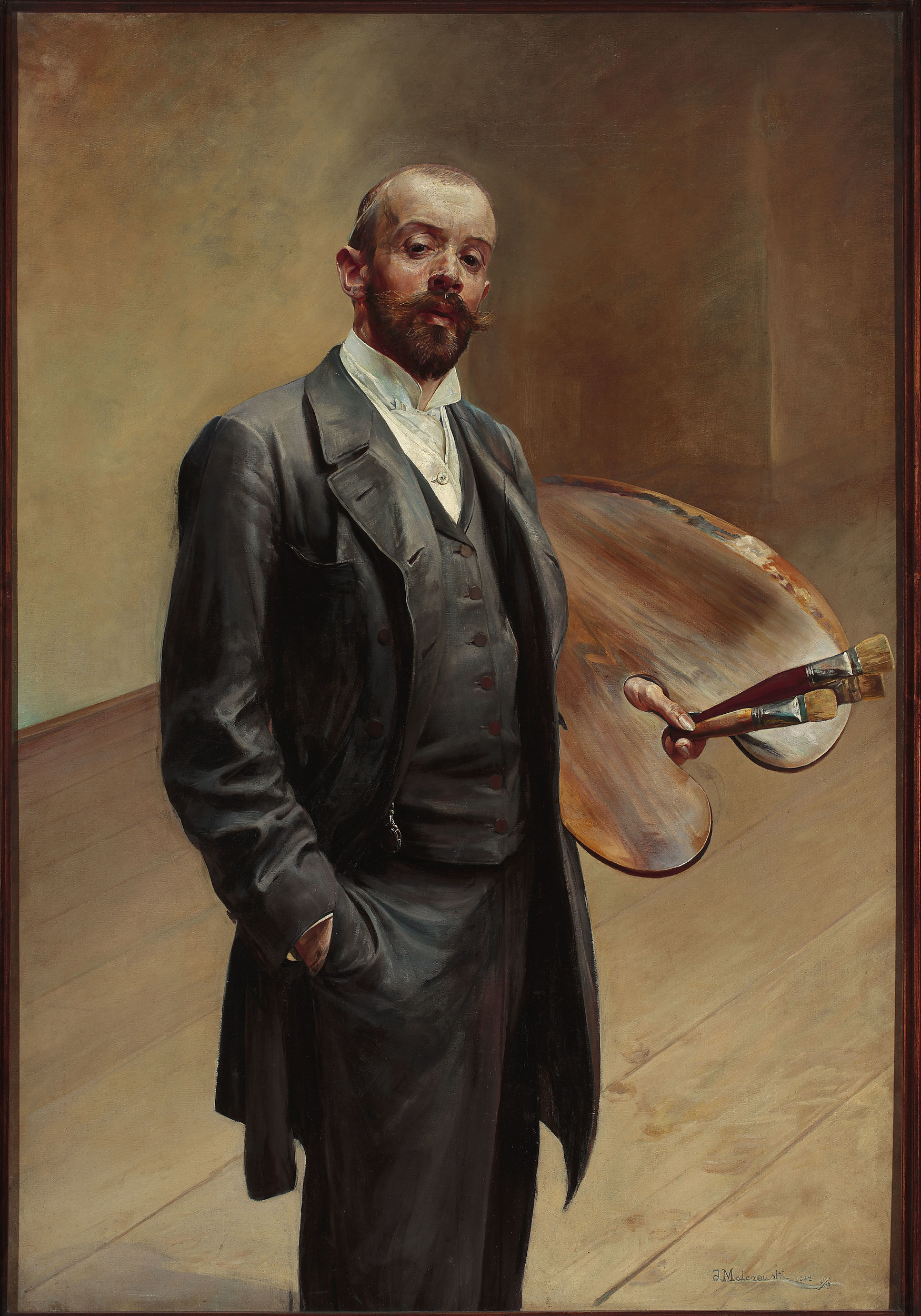
- Self-portrait with palette, 1892
- Born: 15 July 1854; Radom, Congress Poland, Russian Empire
- Died: 8 October 1929 (aged 75); Kraków, Poland
- Known for: Painting
- Movement: Symbolism
- Spouse: Maria née Garlewska
- Children: 2, including Rafał

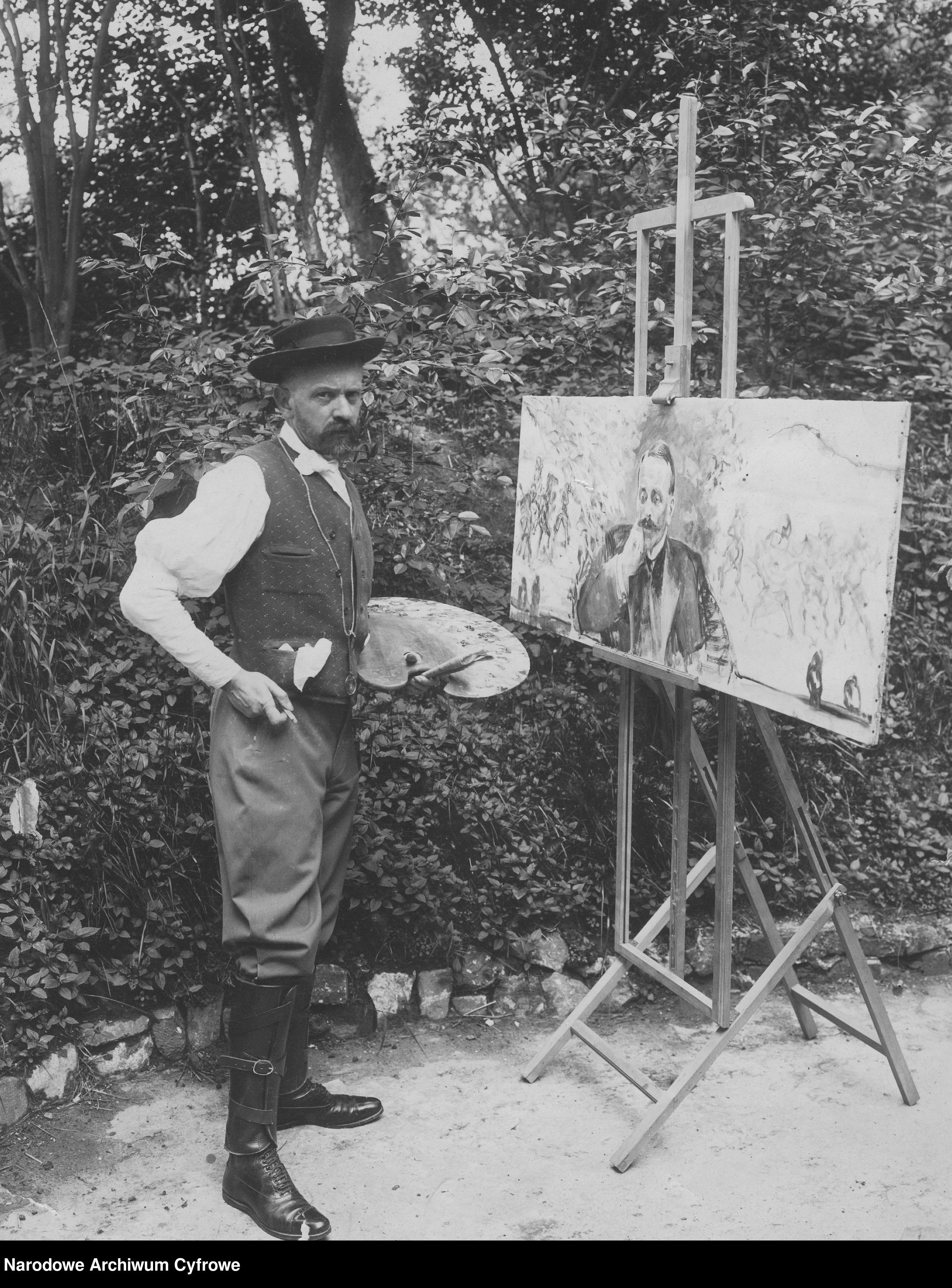
Malczewski in 1909

Jacek Malczewski (Polish: [ˈjat͡sɛk malˈt͡ʂɛfskʲi]; 15 July 1854 – 8 October 1929) was a Polish symbolist painter who was one of the central figures of the patriotic Young Poland movement.

His works combined the predominant style of his time with historical motifs of Polish martyrdom, the romantic aspiration for national independence, Christian and Greek mythology, folk tales, and his love of the natural world.

He was the father of painter Rafał Malczewski.

== Childhood ==
Malczewski was born in Radom, Congress Poland, under occupation of the Russian Empire. During his childhood and early youth he was greatly influenced by his father Julian, a Polish patriot and social activist who introduced him to the world of romantic literature inspired by the November Uprising. On his mother's side, he was related to the Szymanowski family whom they often visited on their Masovian country estate in Cygów. The attractiveness of the Polish landscape and associated folklore had been awakened in him by Feliks Karczewski, his uncle and long-time guardian, who had invited future novelist Adolf Dygasiński to his estate, to act as Jacek's home tutor.

== Artistic career ==
Malczewski moved to Kraków at age 17, and began his artistic education in 1872 under the watchful eye of Polish painter and draughtsman, Leon Piccard and attended his first art classes in the workshop of Władysław Łuszczkiewicz, at the School of Fine Arts. A year later, in 1873, assessed by Jan Matejko himself, Malczewski formally enrolled at the School, and studied with Łuszczkiewicz, Feliks Szynalewski and Florian Cynk. In 1876 he went to Paris and studied for a year at the École des Beaux-Arts, in the studio of Henri Lehmann. He next moved to the Académie Suisse.

Malczewski had already begun master classes with Jan Matejko in 1875 before embarking on the trip to France, and completed them in 1879 after his return from abroad. In spite of considerable stylistic differences between them, Malczewski was greatly influenced by Matejko's historical painting filled with neo-romantic metaphor and patriotic themes. In 1879, Malczewski completed a course in composition under Matejko. He was equally impressed with the dramatic art of earlier Polish romantic painter Artur Grottger. His painting revolved around a few carefully selected motifs, constantly retold and expanded according to mythology and filled with national symbols. His own imagination enabled Malczewski to channel his creativity and let new aesthetic ideas emerge, giving rise to what became Poland's school of Symbolism.

=== Inspiration ===
Over the course of some 30 years between 1885 and 1916, Malczewski regularly visited Paris, Munich and Vienna. He made several trips to Italy, Greece and Turkey. He also took part in an archaeological expedition organized by his friend Karol Lanckoroński. He drew his inspiration from a wide variety of sources, often exotic or biblical, and translated them back into Polish folklore, tradition and motifs in his own painting. His most famous canvases include Błędne koło (Vicious Circle, 1895–97), Melancholia (1890–1894), Natchnienie malarza (Painter's Muse, 1897), Wizja (A vision, 1912), the Thanatos series, and Bajki (Fables). Many of his paintings prominently feature self-portraits in elaborate costume, a trademark of his style, often displaying a great sense of self-mocking humour.

In 1897–1900 and 1912–1921 Malczewski served as professor of the Academy of Fine Arts in Kraków. He was elected rector of the academy in 1912. His art has been compared to that of the Frenchman Gustave Moreau, the Swiss Arnold Böcklin, and even to the Spaniard Salvador Dalí. His paintings won numerous awards at international exhibitions including Berlin in 1891, Munich in 1892, and Paris in 1900.

== Personal life ==
Malczewski was married to Maria née Garlewska and they had two children, Julia (born 1888) and Rafał (born 1892), also a painter. His son later sold off all of his father's works left to him, to the National Museum in Warsaw before World War II. During the war he left Poland and after travels in Southern Europe and Brazil, finally settled in Montreal.

It is believed that the subject of numerous nude studies in Jacek Malczewski's paintings, Maria Bal (Balowa) née Brunicka, was also his long-time lover. He lost his sight towards the end of his life and died in Kraków on 8 October 1929. He was buried at Skałka, Poland's national Panthéon.

== Art market ==
In November 2022, Malczewski's 1908 oil-on-canvas painting entitled Reality (Polish: Rzeczywistość) was sold at DESA Unicum auction house in Warsaw for 17 million zlotys (€3.6 million) setting a new record for the most expensive painting sold on the Polish art market. The sale of the piece remains on hold after doubts were raised about the legal status of this property as the National Museum in Warsaw claims ownership of the work of art. The painting was last seen in public in 1926 in Lwów (now Lviv, Ukraine). Its later whereabouts were unknown. The Polish Ministry of Culture and National Heritage reported to the police authorities that the painting could have been illegally taken from Poland in the 1950s.

== Selected works ==
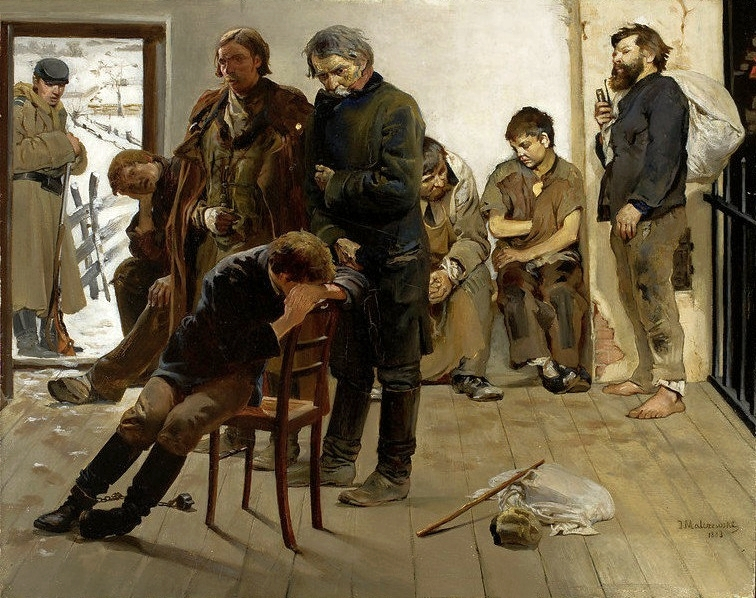
The Prisoners, 1883, National Museum in Warsaw

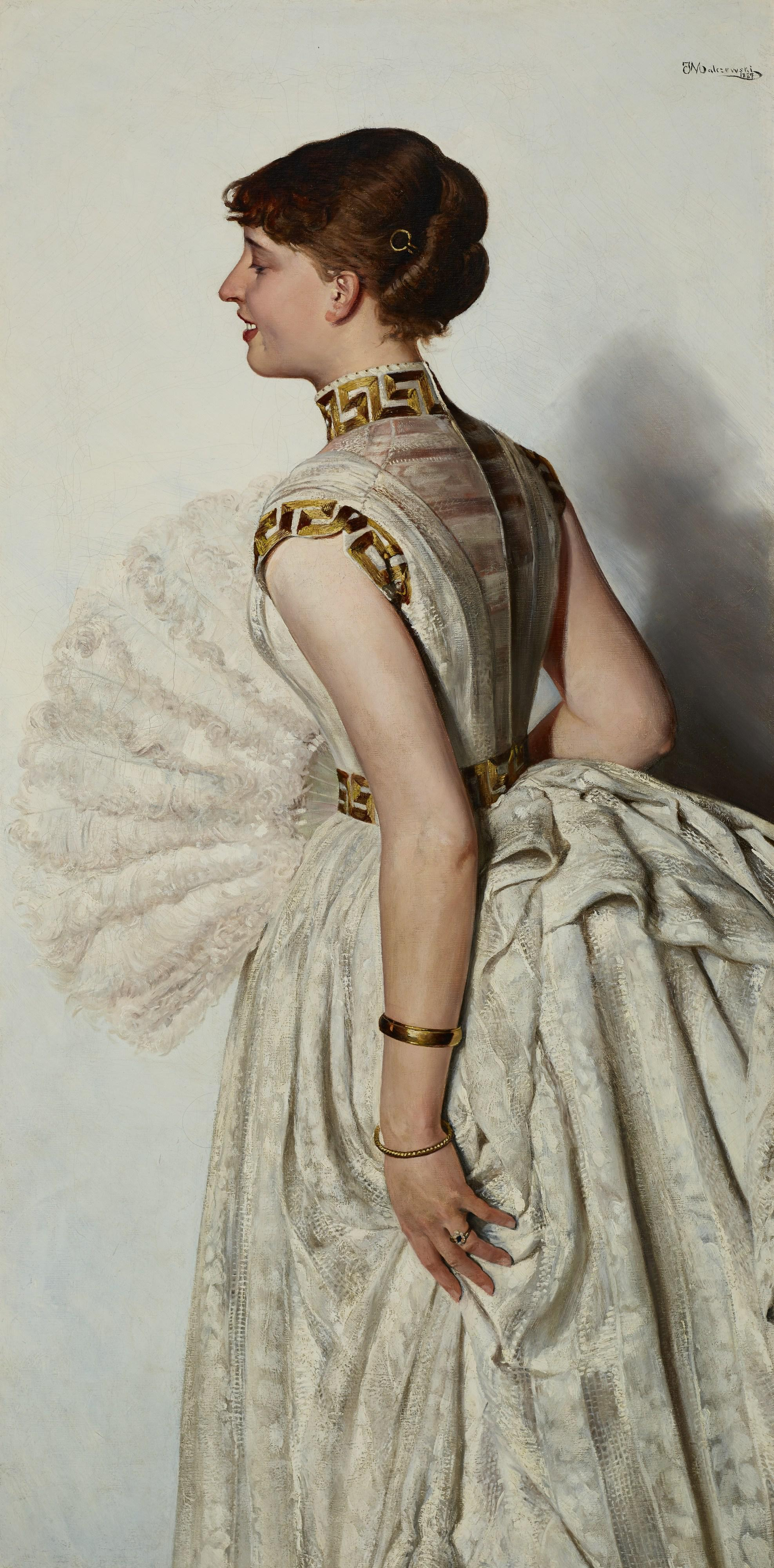
Portrait of a Bride, 1887, National Museum in Kraków

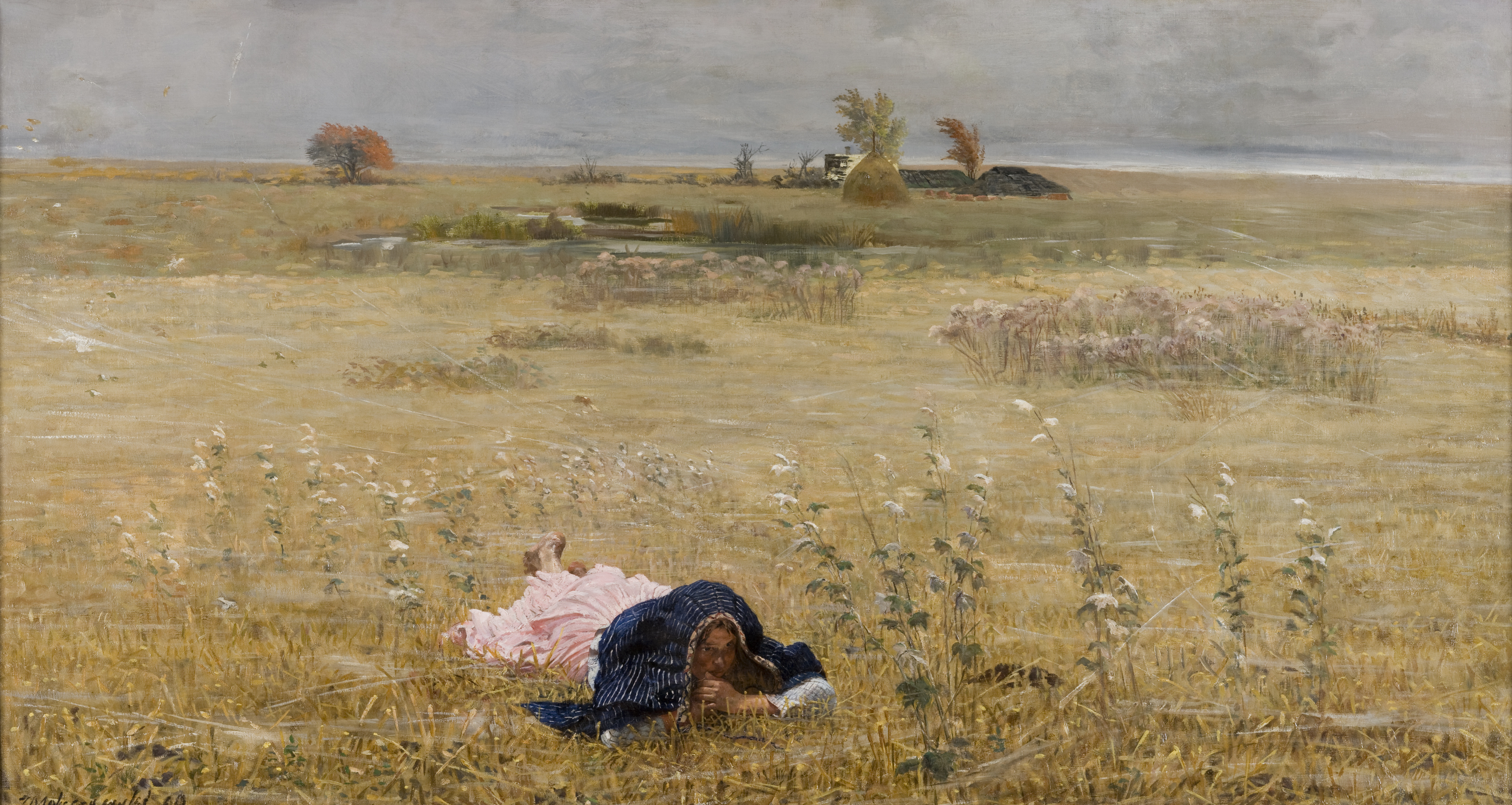
In Autumn, 1890, National Museum in Kraków

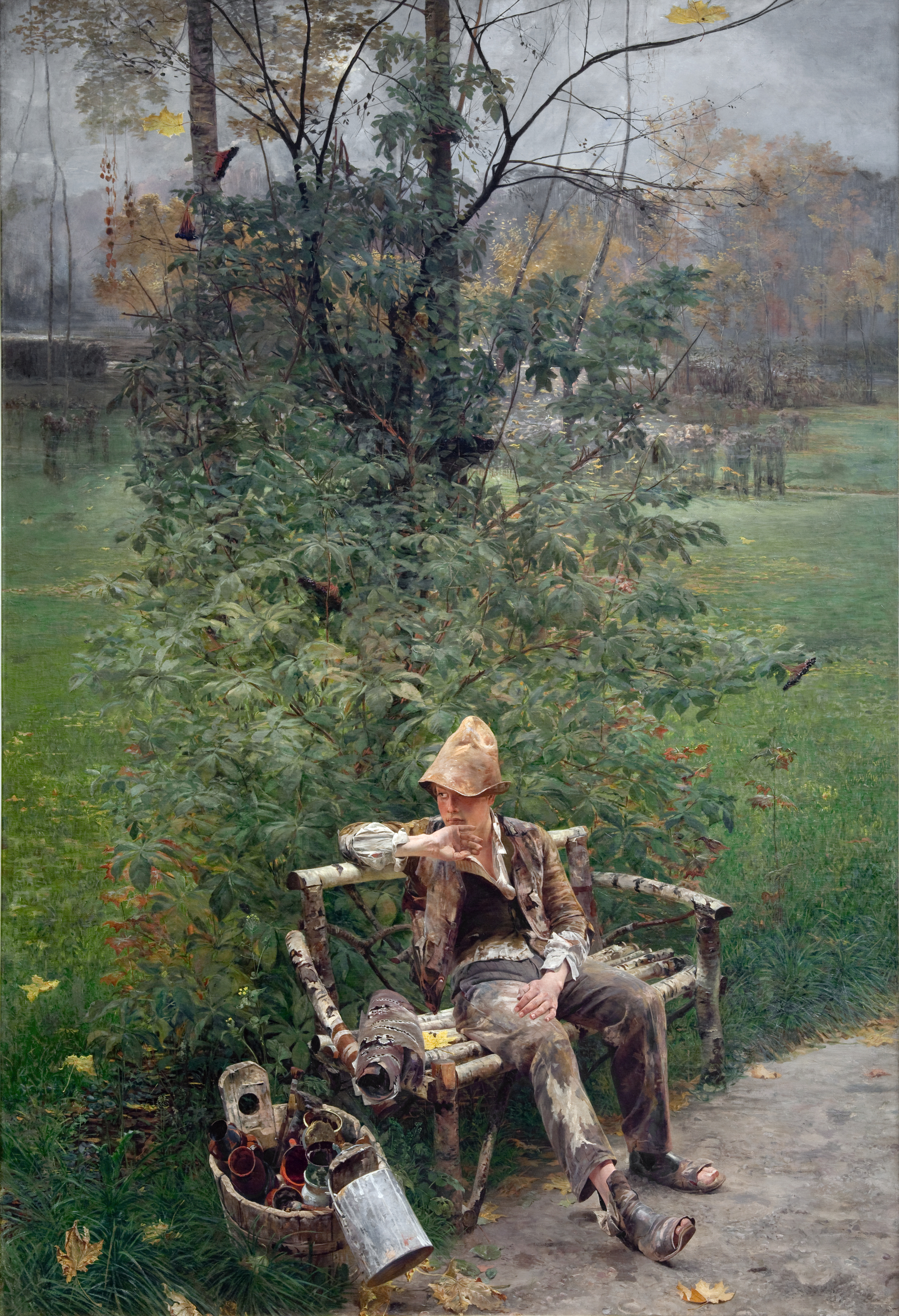
Introduction, 1890, National Museum in Kraków

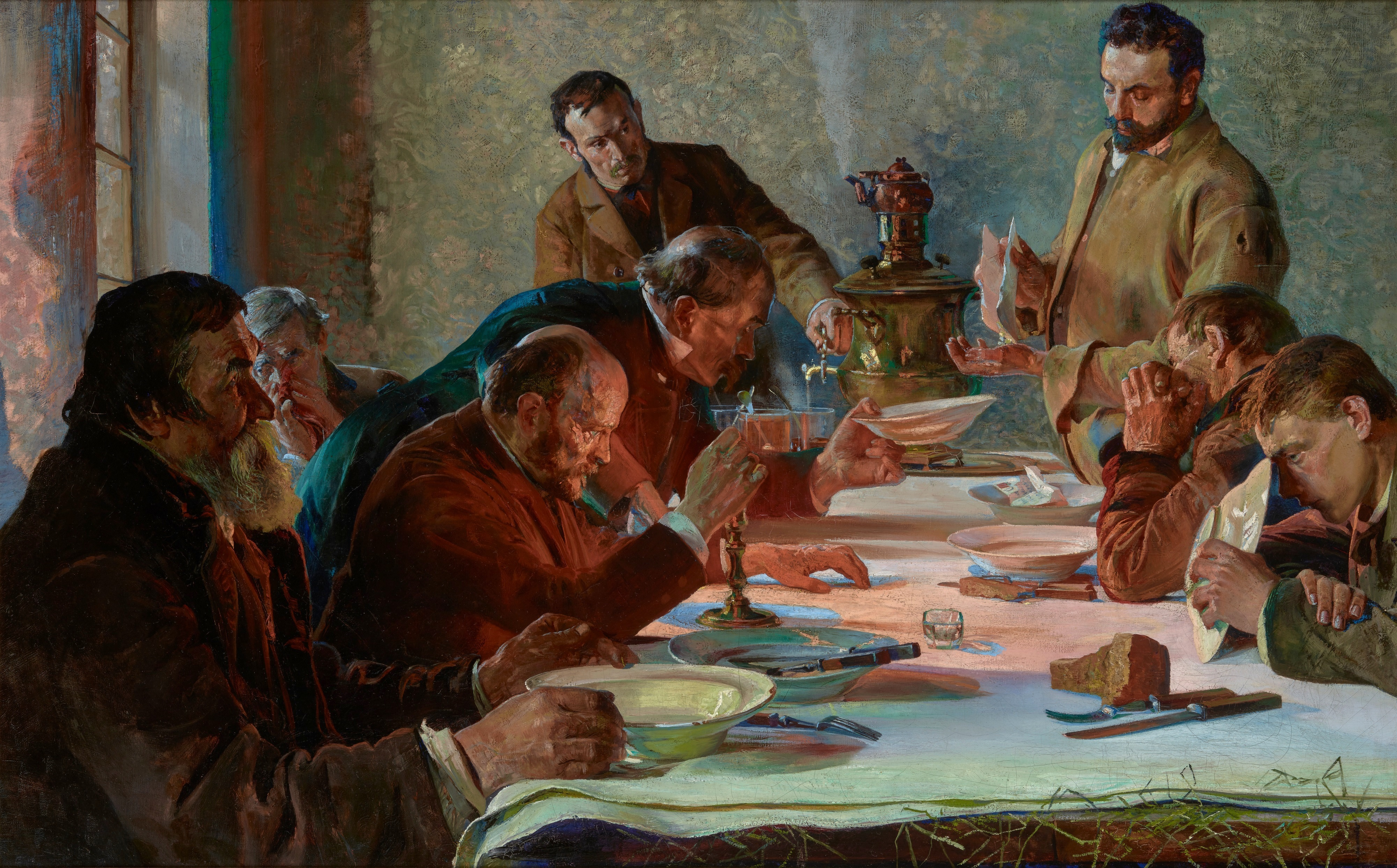
Siberian Wigilia, 1892, National Museum in Kraków

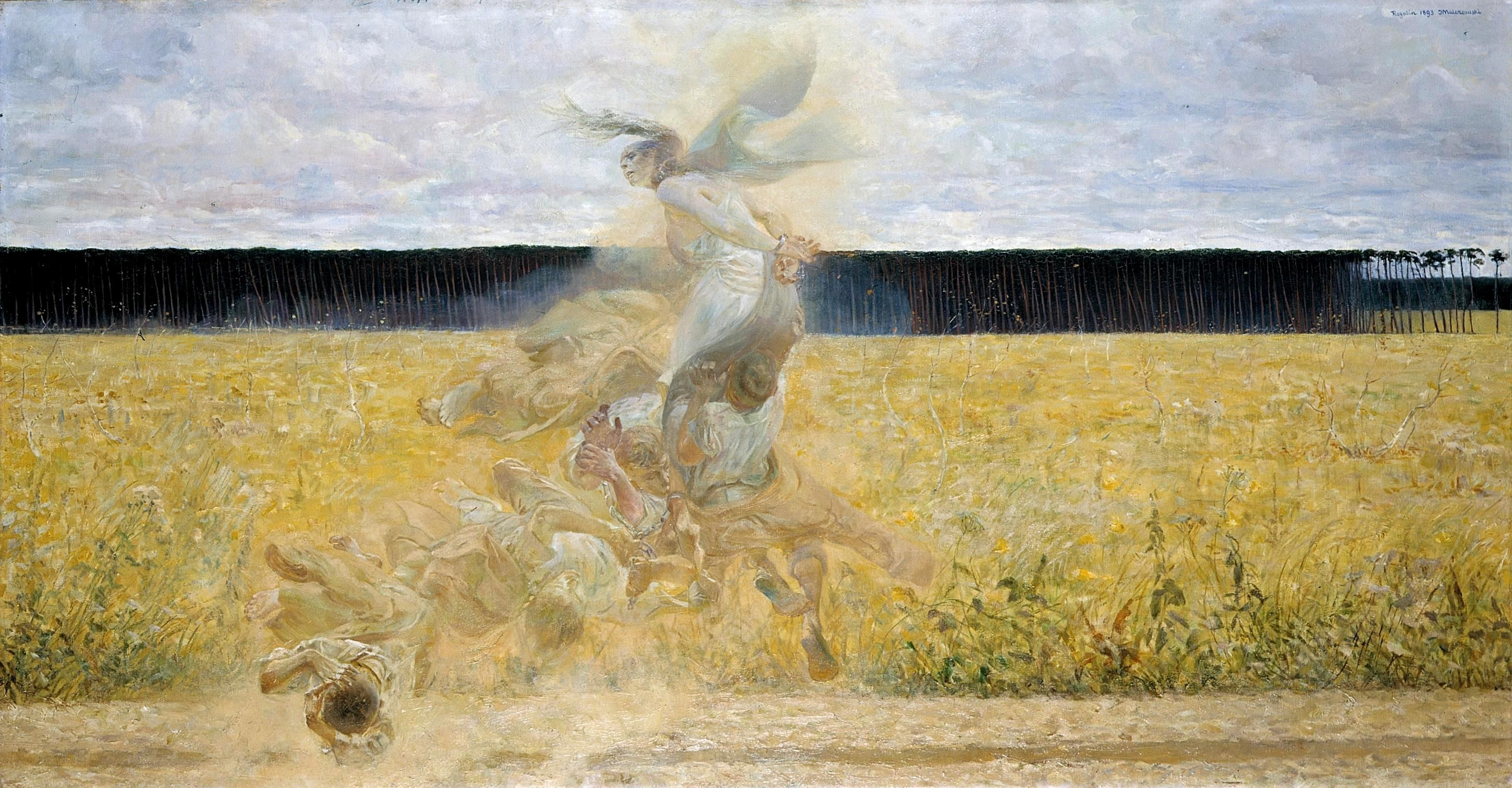
In the dust cloud, 1893-1894, Raczyński Art Gallery in Rogalin (part of National Museum in Poznań)

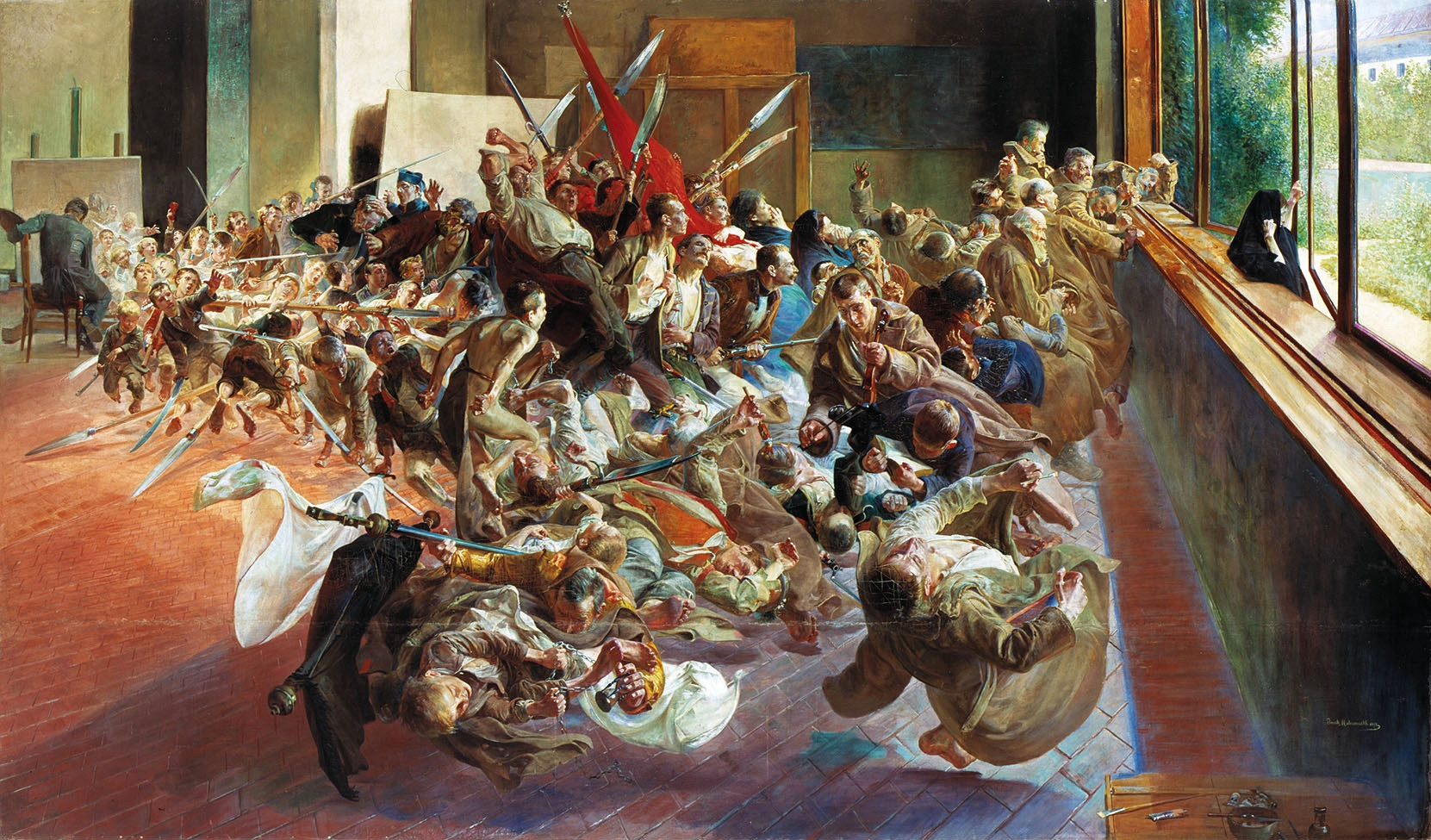
Melancholia, 1894, Raczyński Art Gallery in Rogalin (part of National Museum in Poznań)

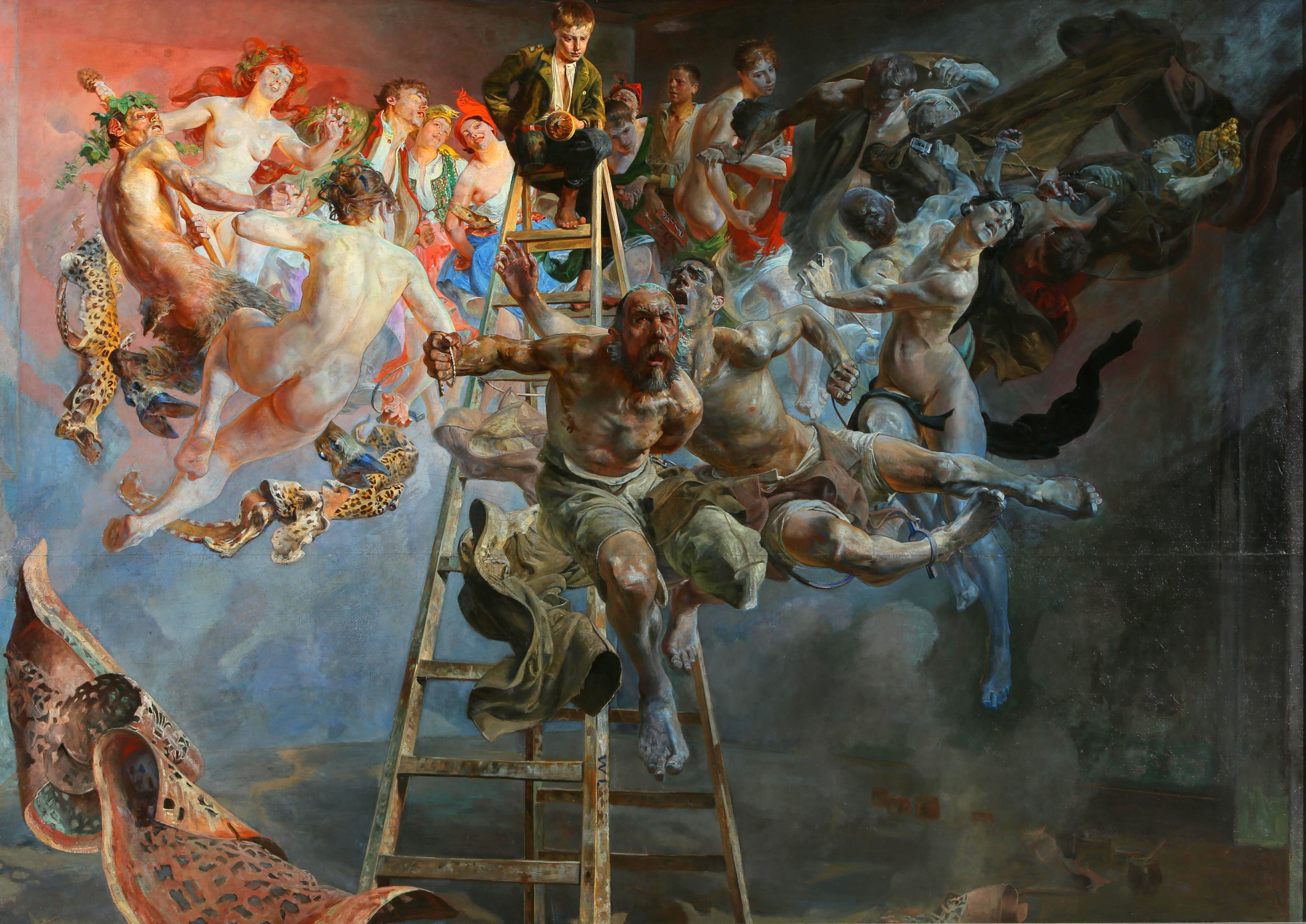
Vicious Circle, 1895-1897, National Museum in Poznań

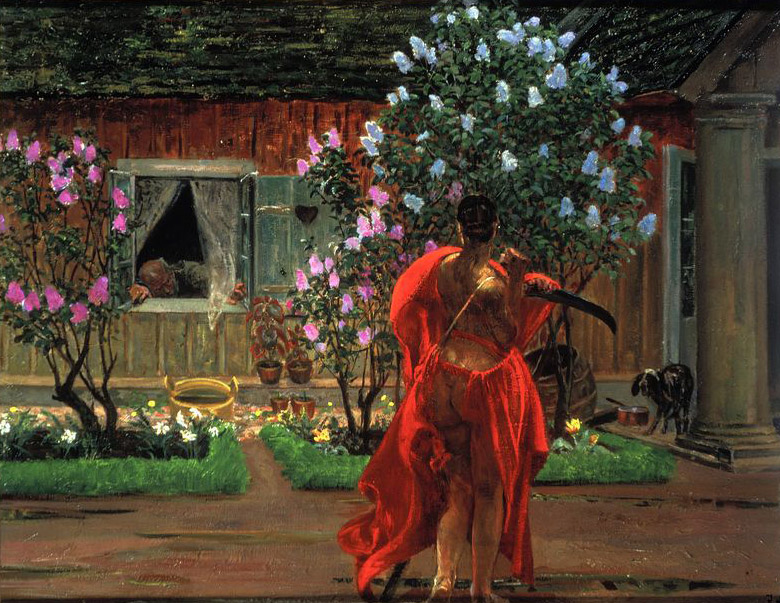
Thanatos, ca. 1899, National Museum in Warsaw

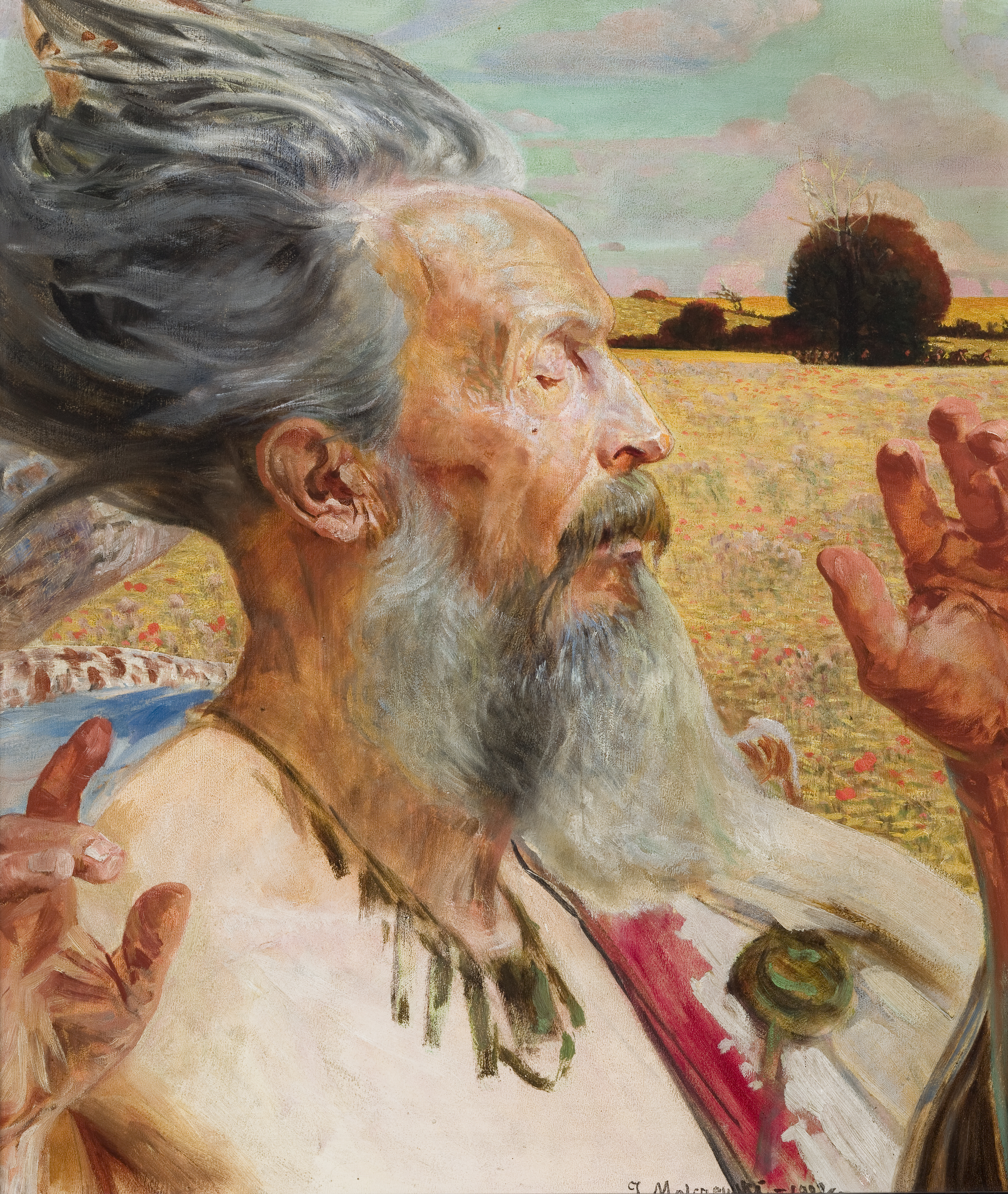
Derwid, 1902, National Museum in Kraków

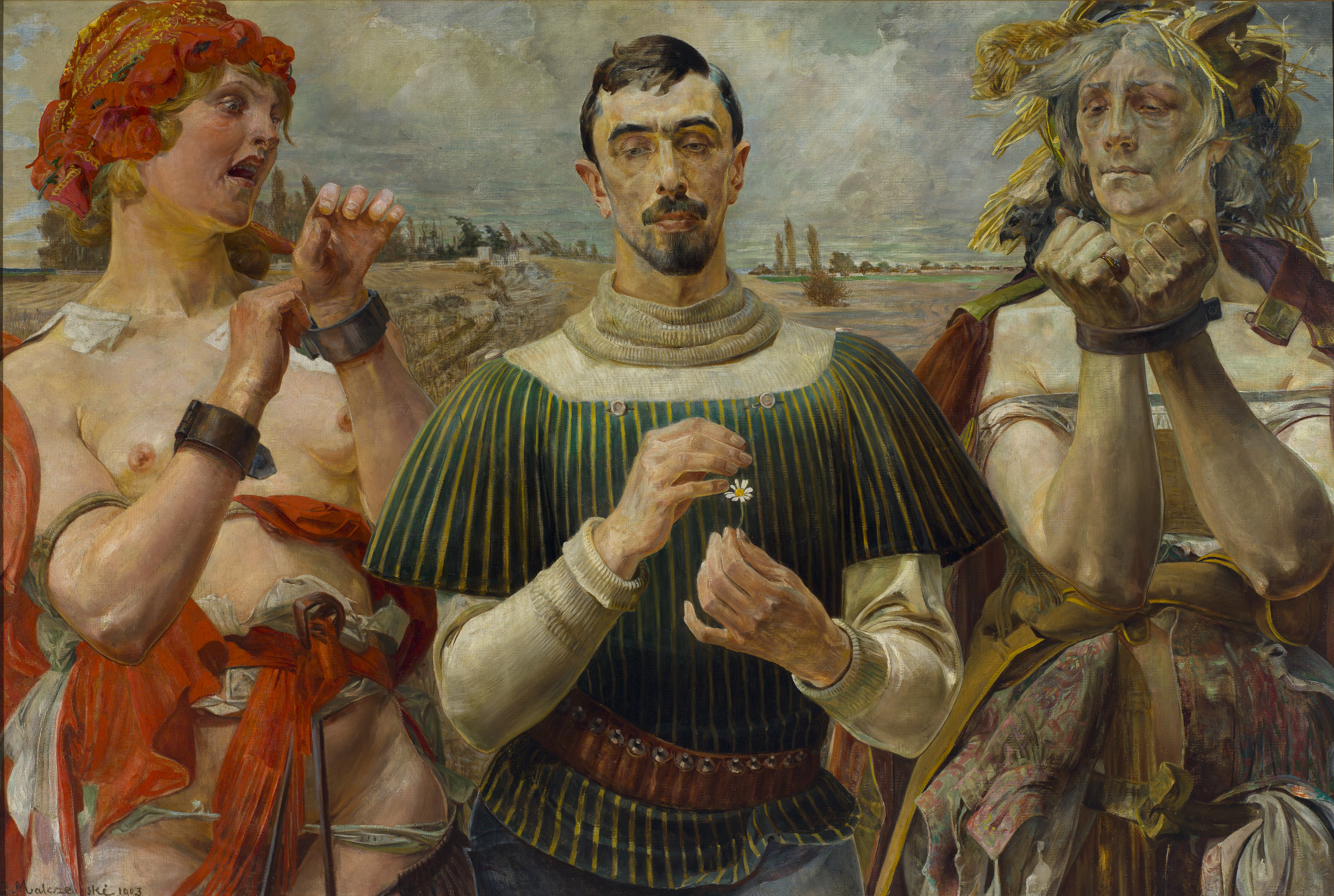
Poland's Hamlet, 1903, National Museum in Warsaw

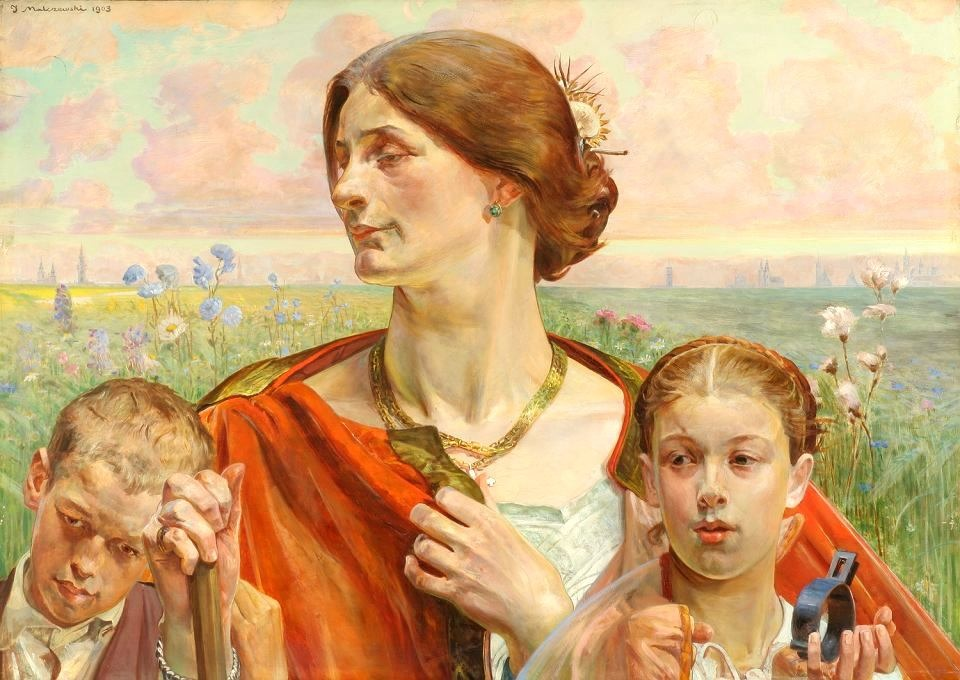
Motherland. Portrait of Maria Bal, 1903, National Museum in Wrocław

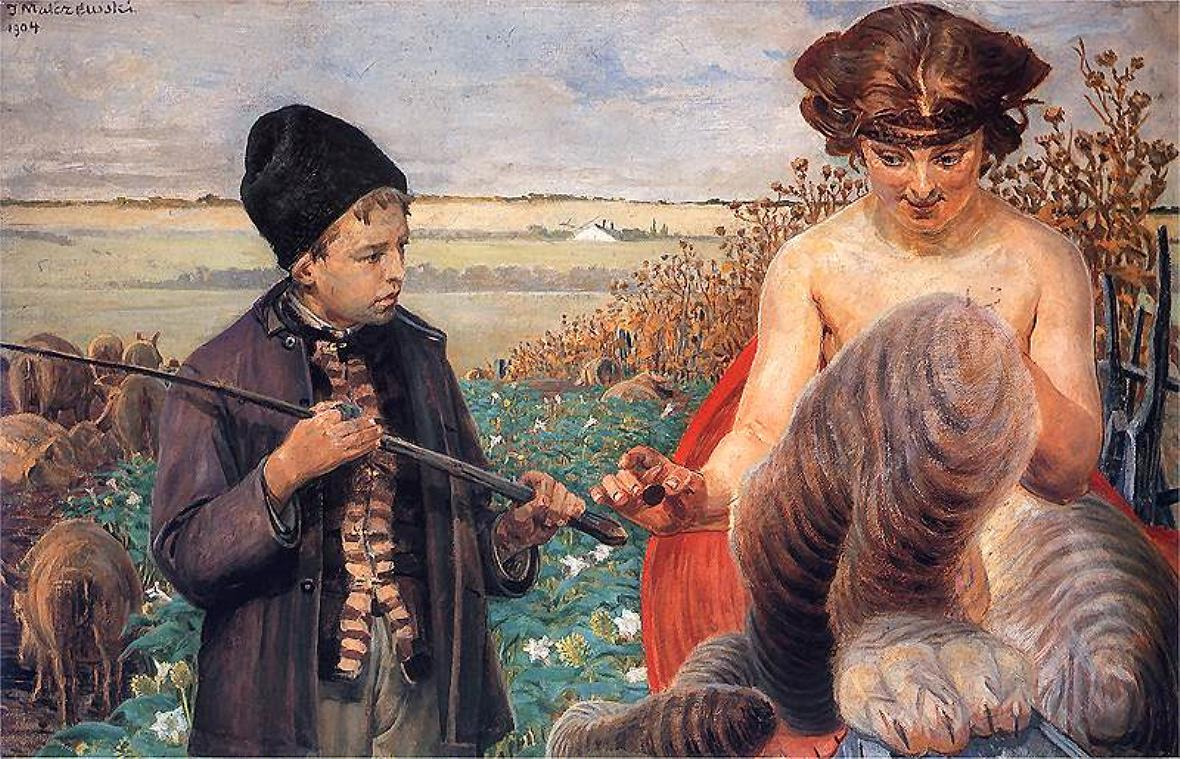
Temptation of Fortune, 1904, National Museum in Poznań

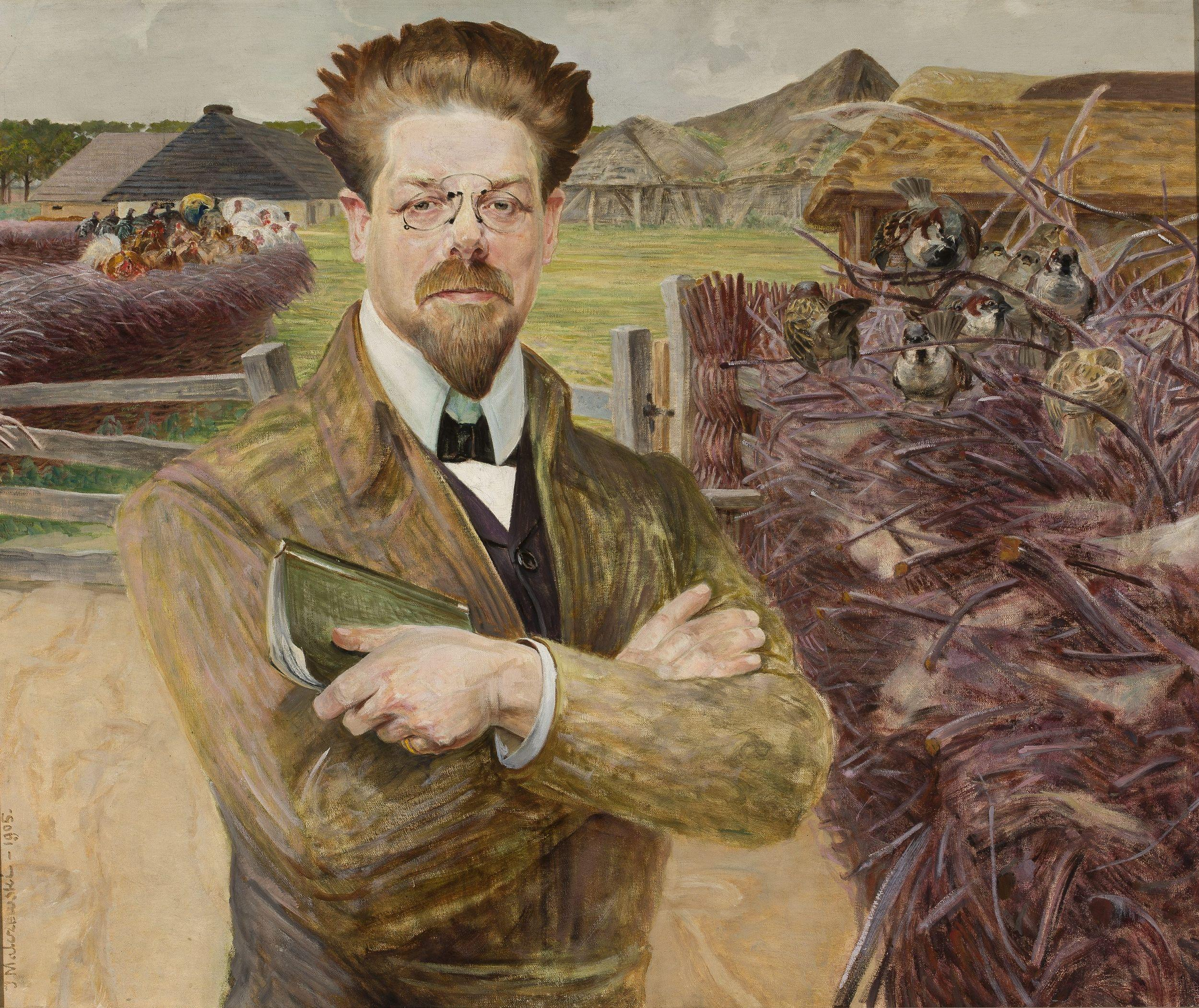
Portrait of Władysław Reymont, 1905, National Museum in Warsaw

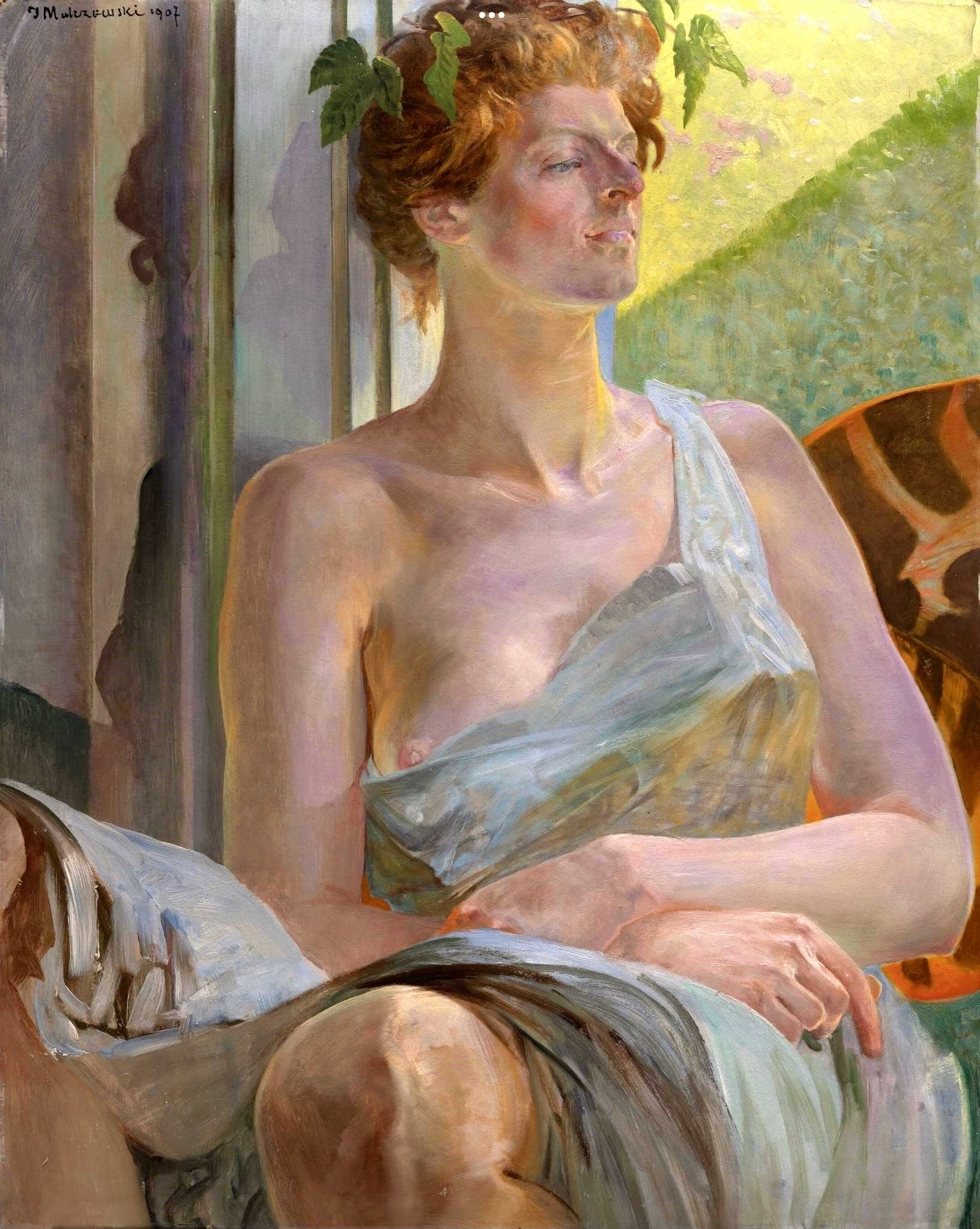
Bacchante, ca. 1907, Lviv National Art Gallery

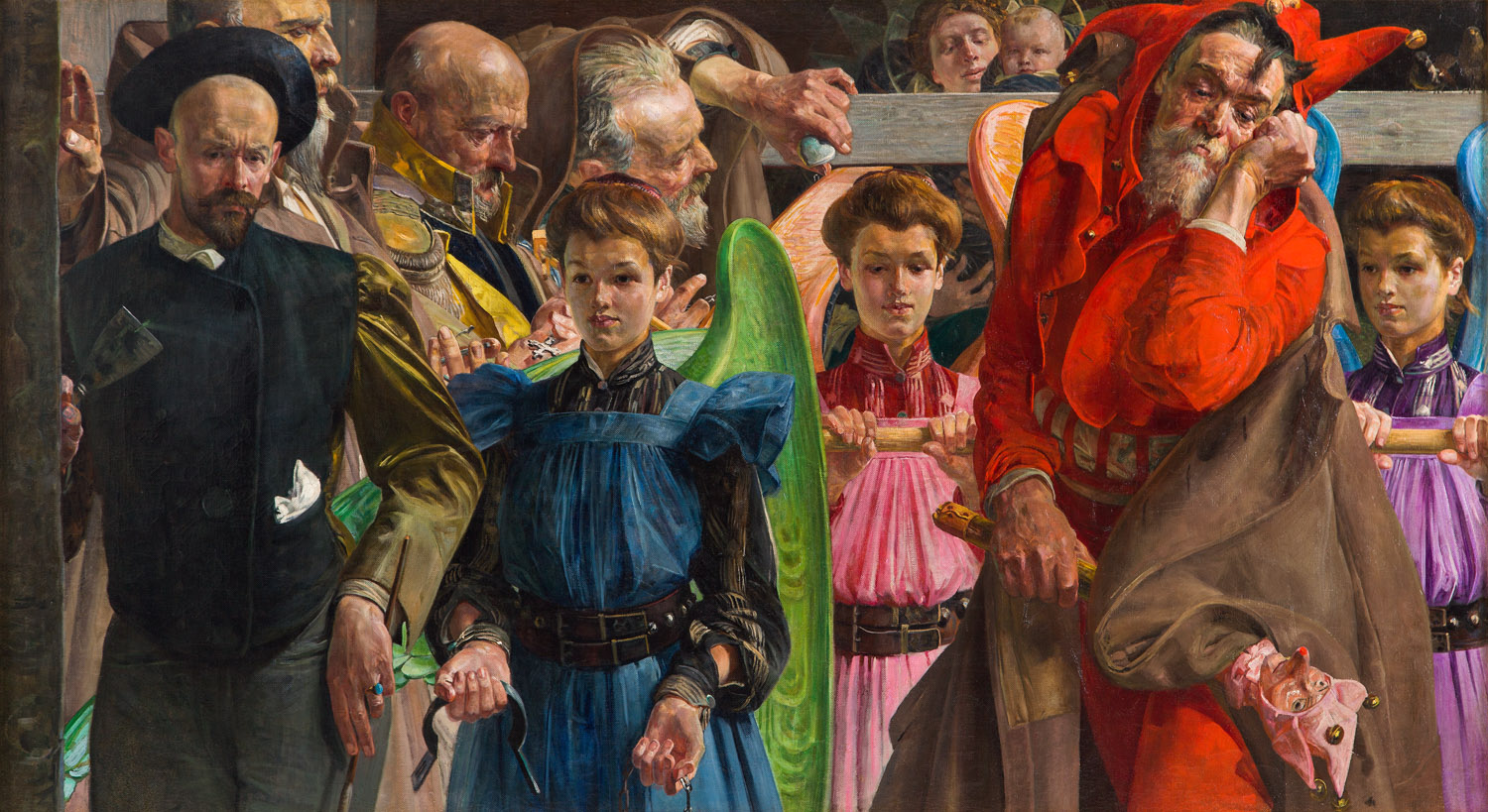
Reality, 1908

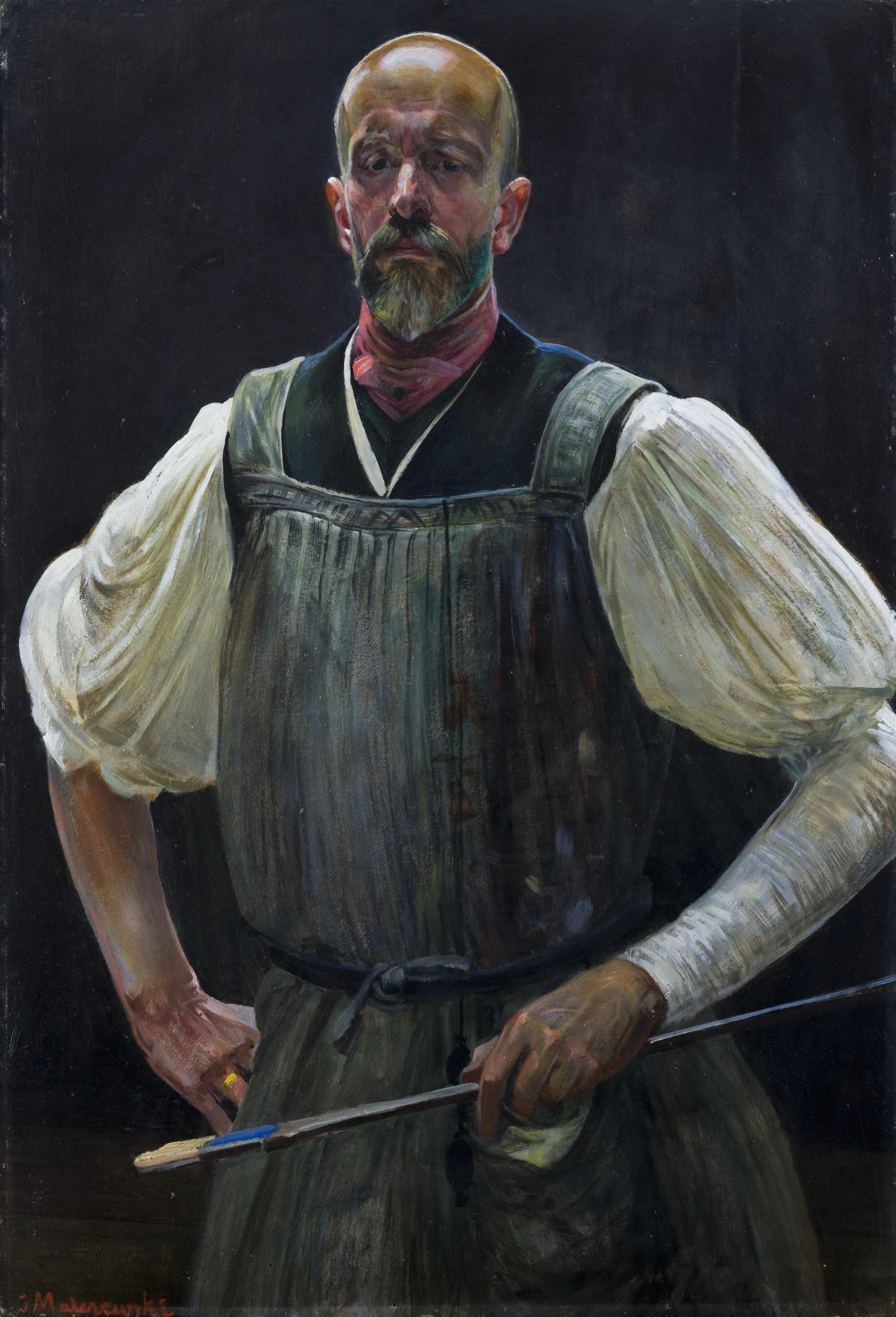
Self-Portrait, 1908-1915, National Museum in Kraków

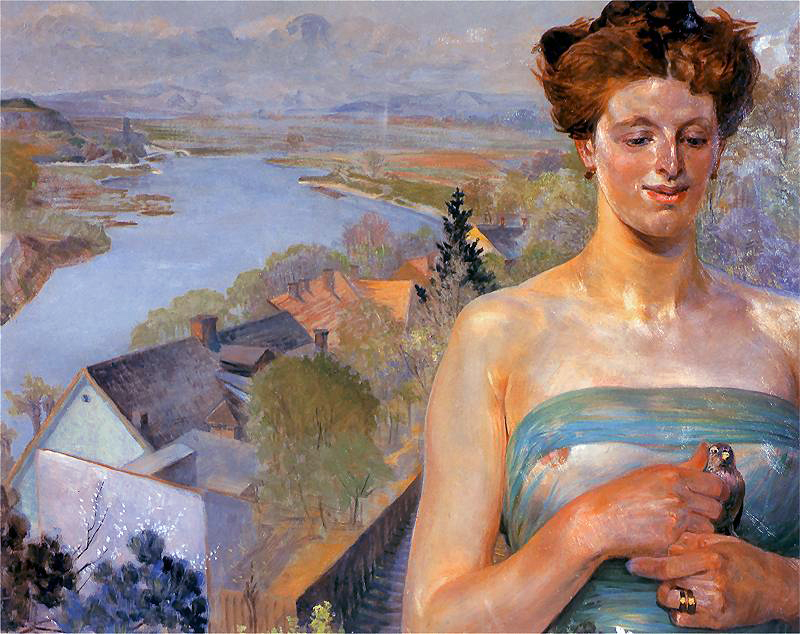
Spring, 1909, Private collection

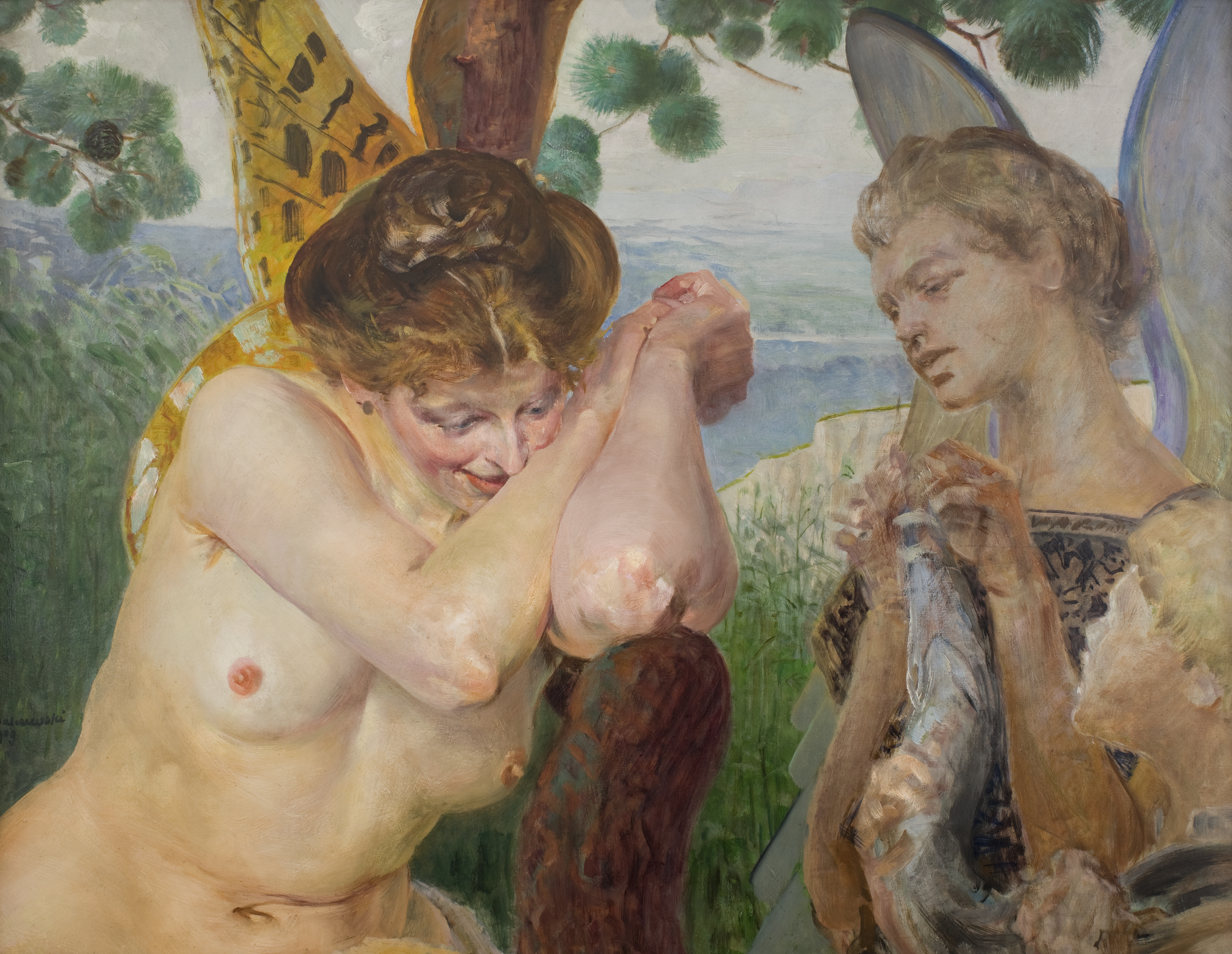
Tobias with a Harpy, 1909, National Museum in Kraków

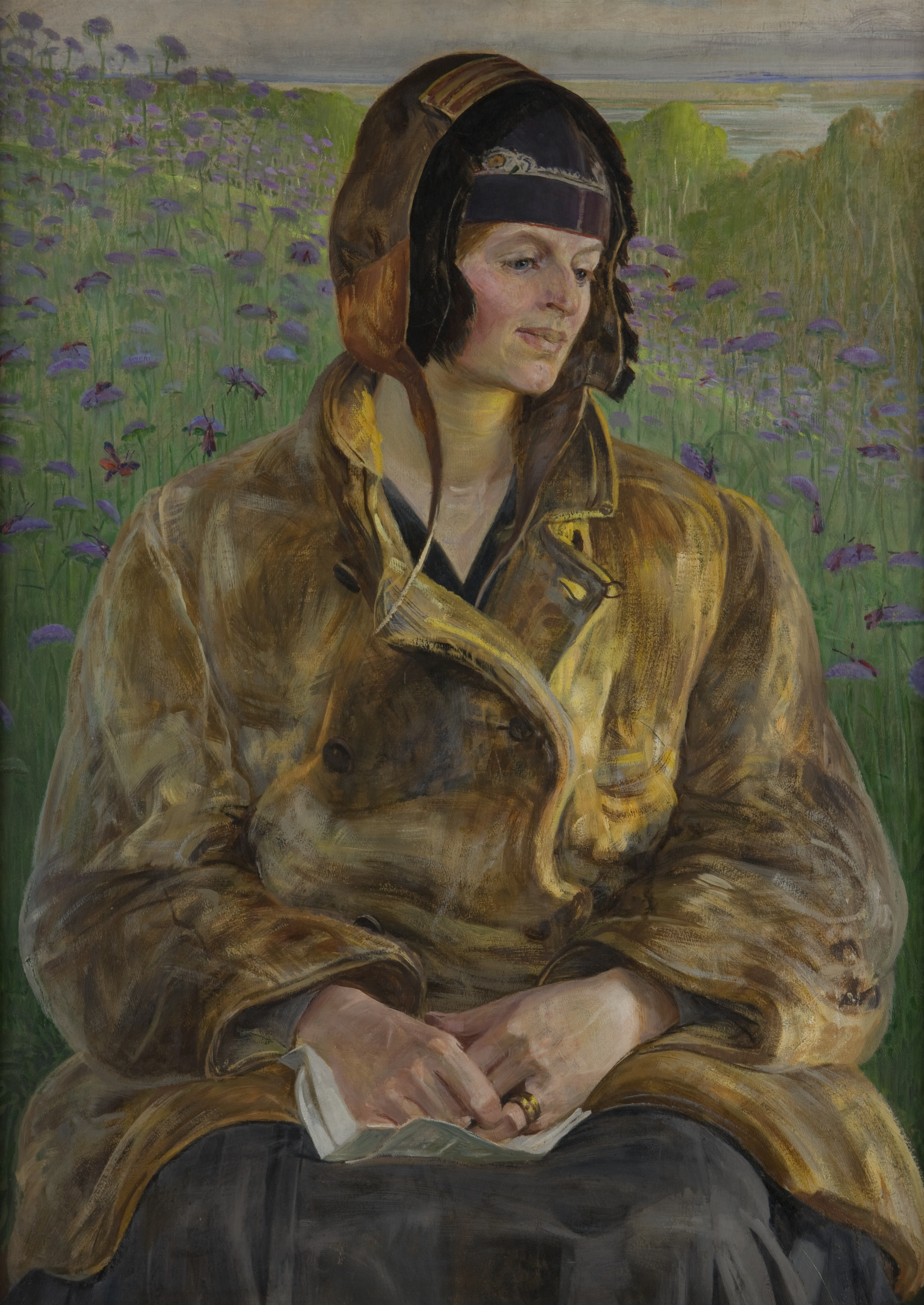
Ellenai, 1910, National Museum in Kraków

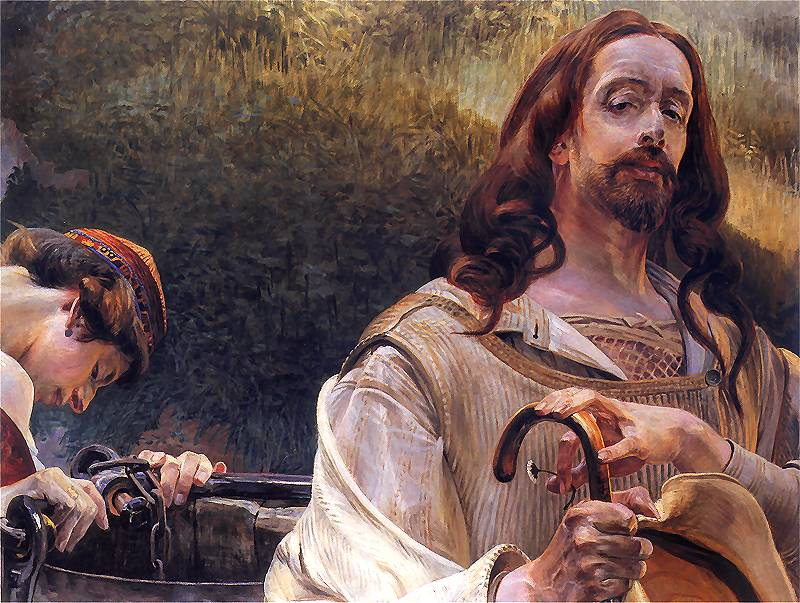
Christ and Samaritan Woman at the Well, 1910, Private collection

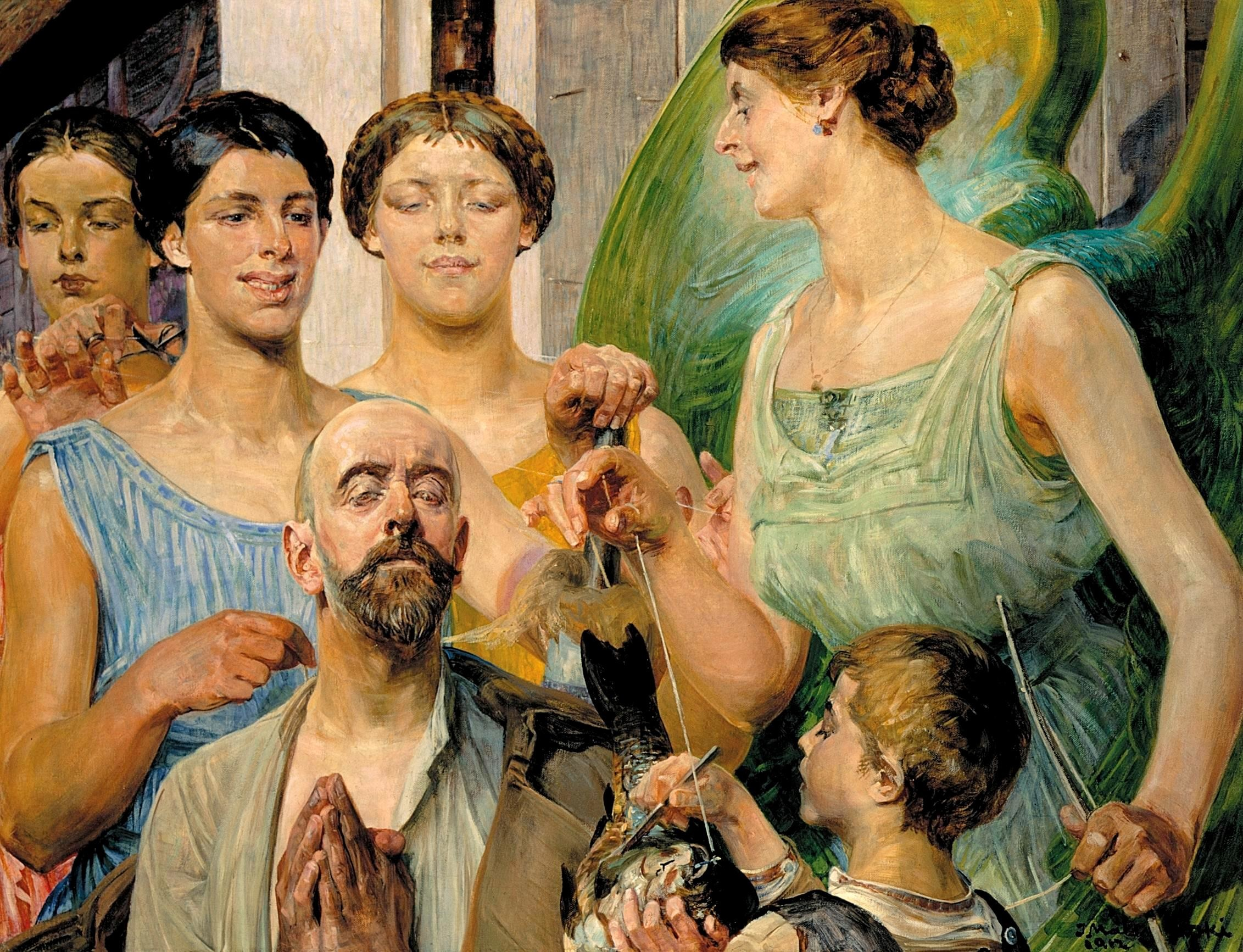
Tobias and Parcae, 1912, National Museum in Poznań

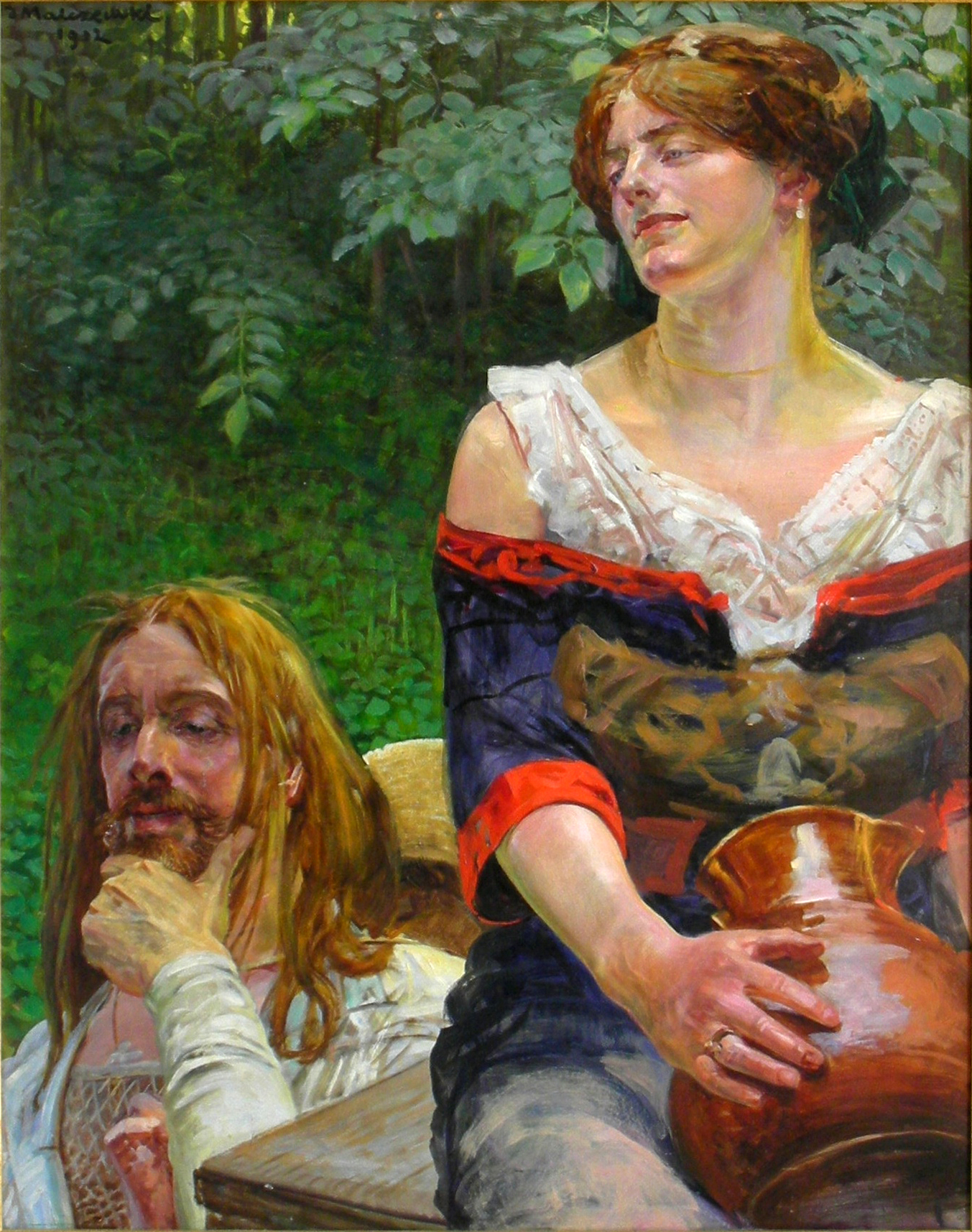
Christ and the Samaritian Woman, 1912, Lviv National Art Gallery

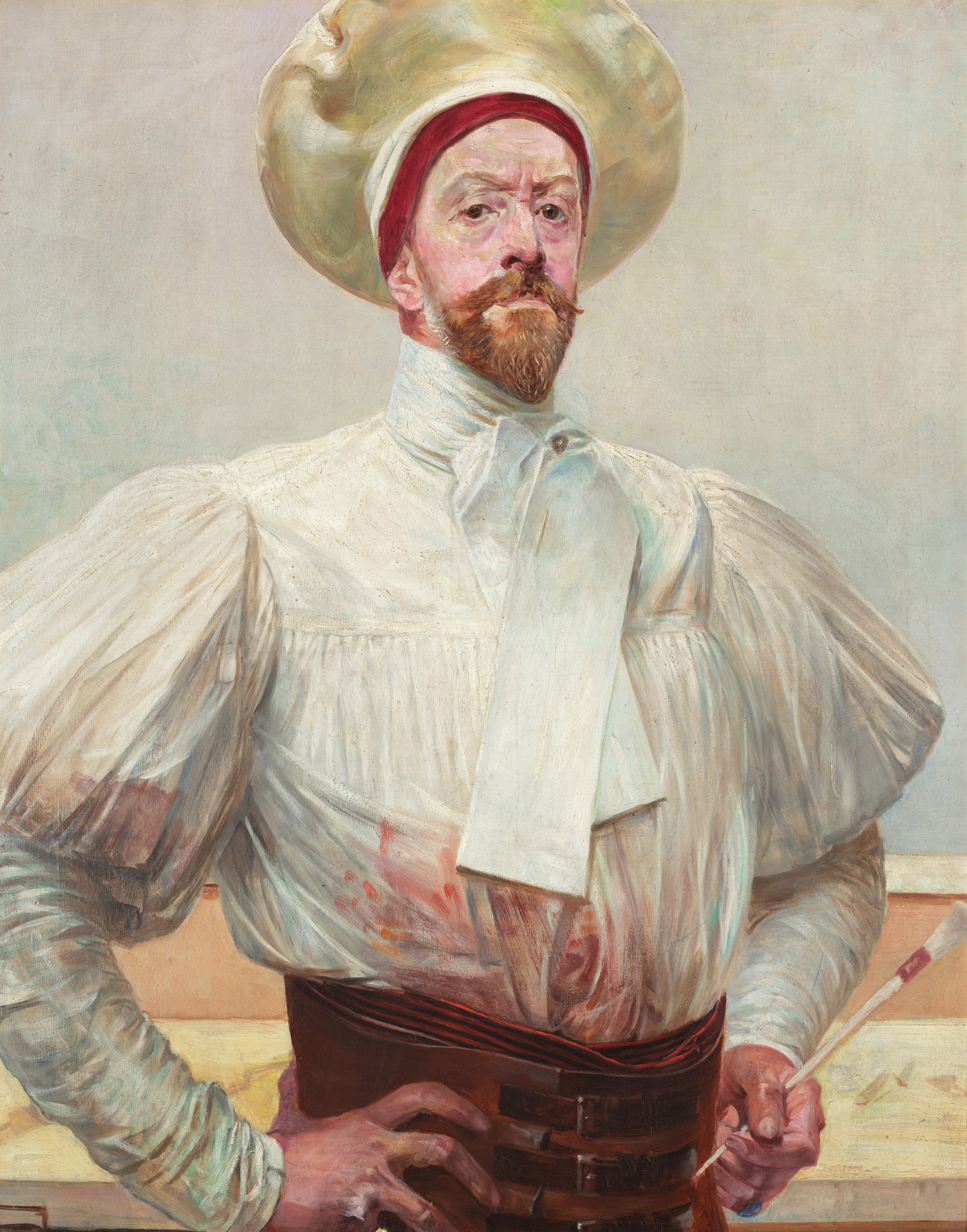
Self-Portrait in a White Beret, 1914, National Museum in Kraków

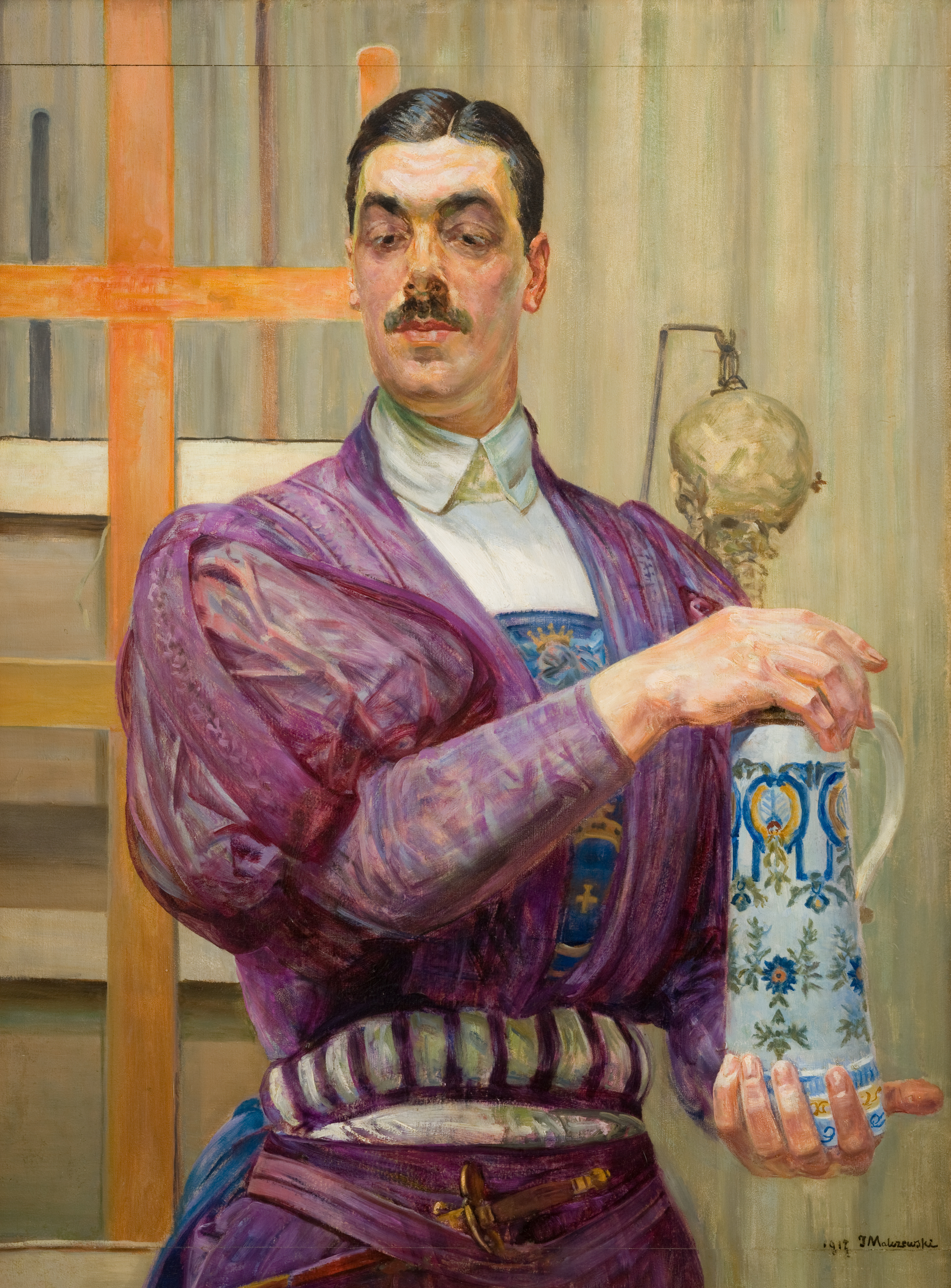
Young Poland, 1917, National Museum in Kraków

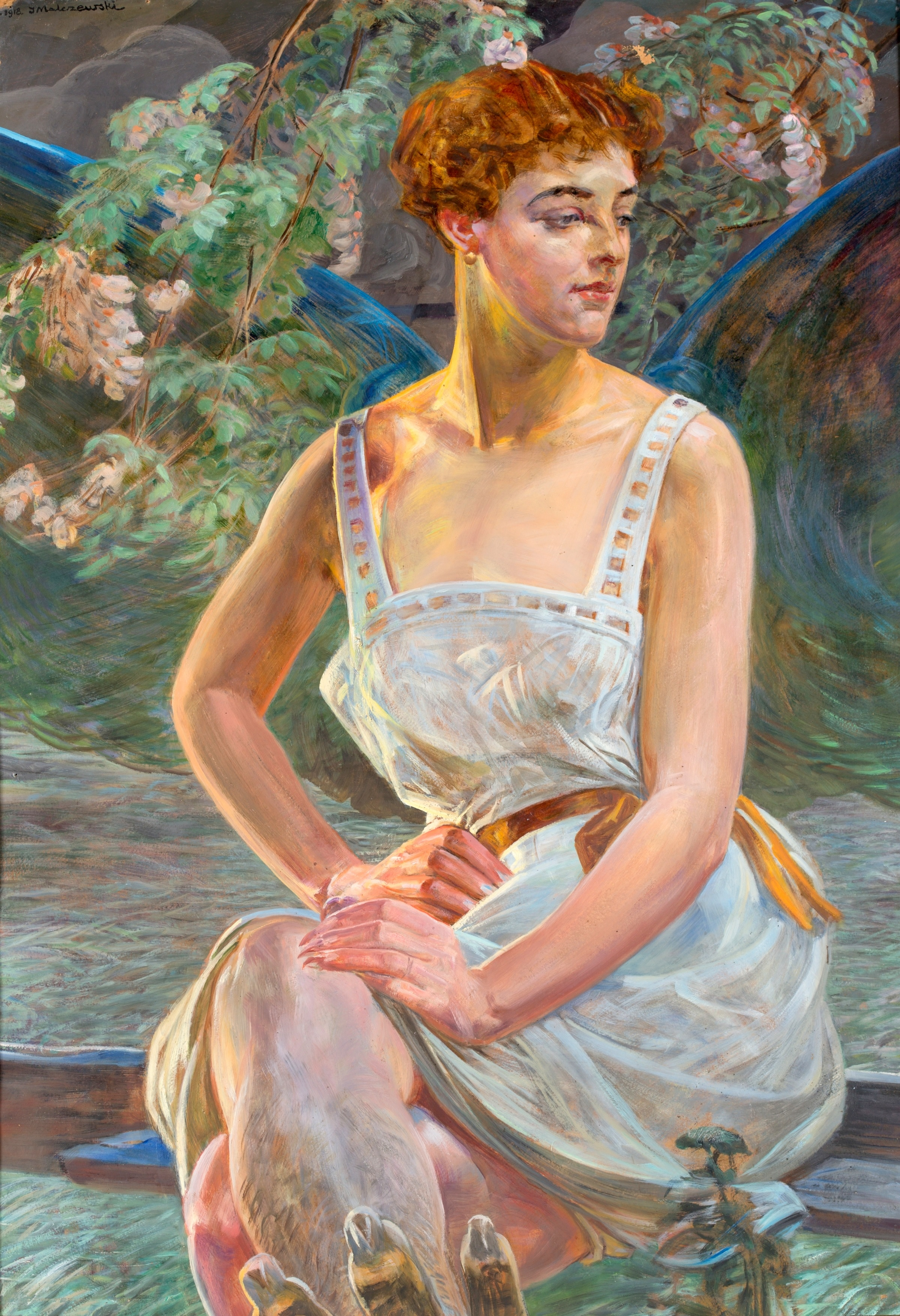
Preludium, 1918, Private collection

== See also ==
- Culture of Kraków
- City of Radom
- List of Polish painters
- List of Poles
- National Museum in Kraków
- Sukiennice Museum in Kraków
