= Vicious Circle (painting) =

Painting by Jacek Malczewski

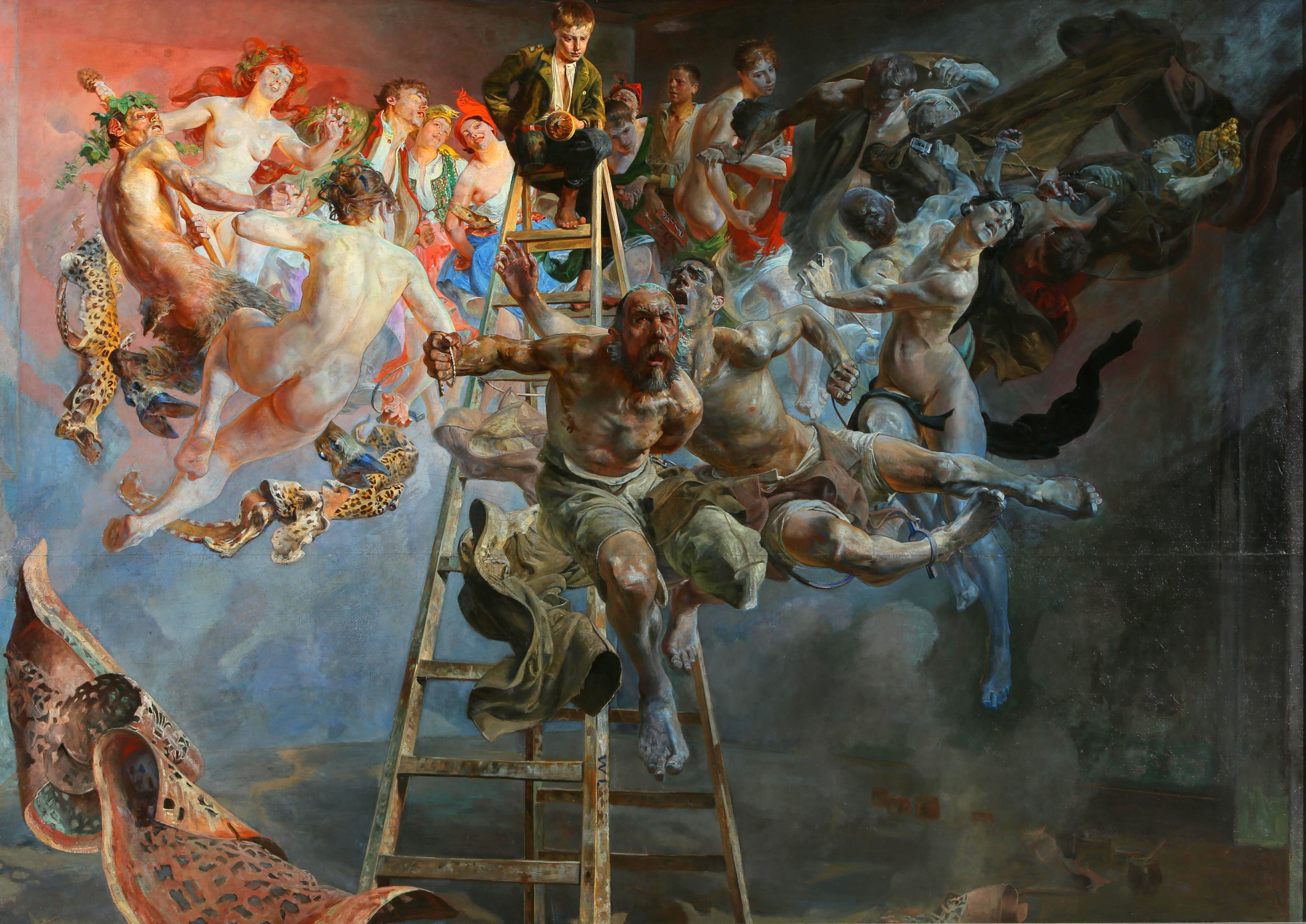
- Artist: Jacek Malczewski
- Year: 1895–1897
- Medium: Oil-on-canvas
- Dimensions: 174 cm × 240 cm (68.5 in × 94.4 in)
- Location: National Museum, Poznań

Vicious Circle (Polish: Błędne koło) is an oil painting from 1895–1897 by the Polish symbolist painter Jacek Malczewski (1854–1929). It has been considered one of Malczewski's major works and is generally interpreted as an allegory of the role of an artist. It is now displayed in the National Museum in Poznań, Poland.

== Description and analysis ==
The painting depicts a fantastic vision of human figures whirling dynamically in mid-air in a magical circle. The artist represented himself as a pensive boy sitting on top of a stepladder above the titular vicious circle and holding a brush in his hand. He is surrounded by the naked bodies of Bacchantes; youths and elderly men personifying the feelings and imagination of a young artist. Paradoxically, they seem both real thanks to the painting's illusory visual expression and unreal because of the abstract space they occupy in the painting. The left and better-lit side of the painting symbolizes sensual ecstasy while the right, dark side represents the fears and anxiety of the artist. According to Irena Kossowska, this inner dualism of the artist's creativity portrays the vitality of human instincts as well as the tragedy of human fate. In this work, Malczewski expresses the idea of the tortured creative genius of the artist who is searching for inspiration. The work can be interpreted as a question on the nature of art and the vocation of an artist.

== Trivia ==
Commenting on Vicious Circle, philosopher, painter and playwright Stanisław Ignacy Witkiewicz said that the artist and art in general play an important cognitive role. Artists can see the human soul by ridding themselves of ordinary ways of thinking while creating in direct contact with the universe.

== See also ==
- Young Poland
- List of Polish painters
