= Polonia (personification) =

National personification

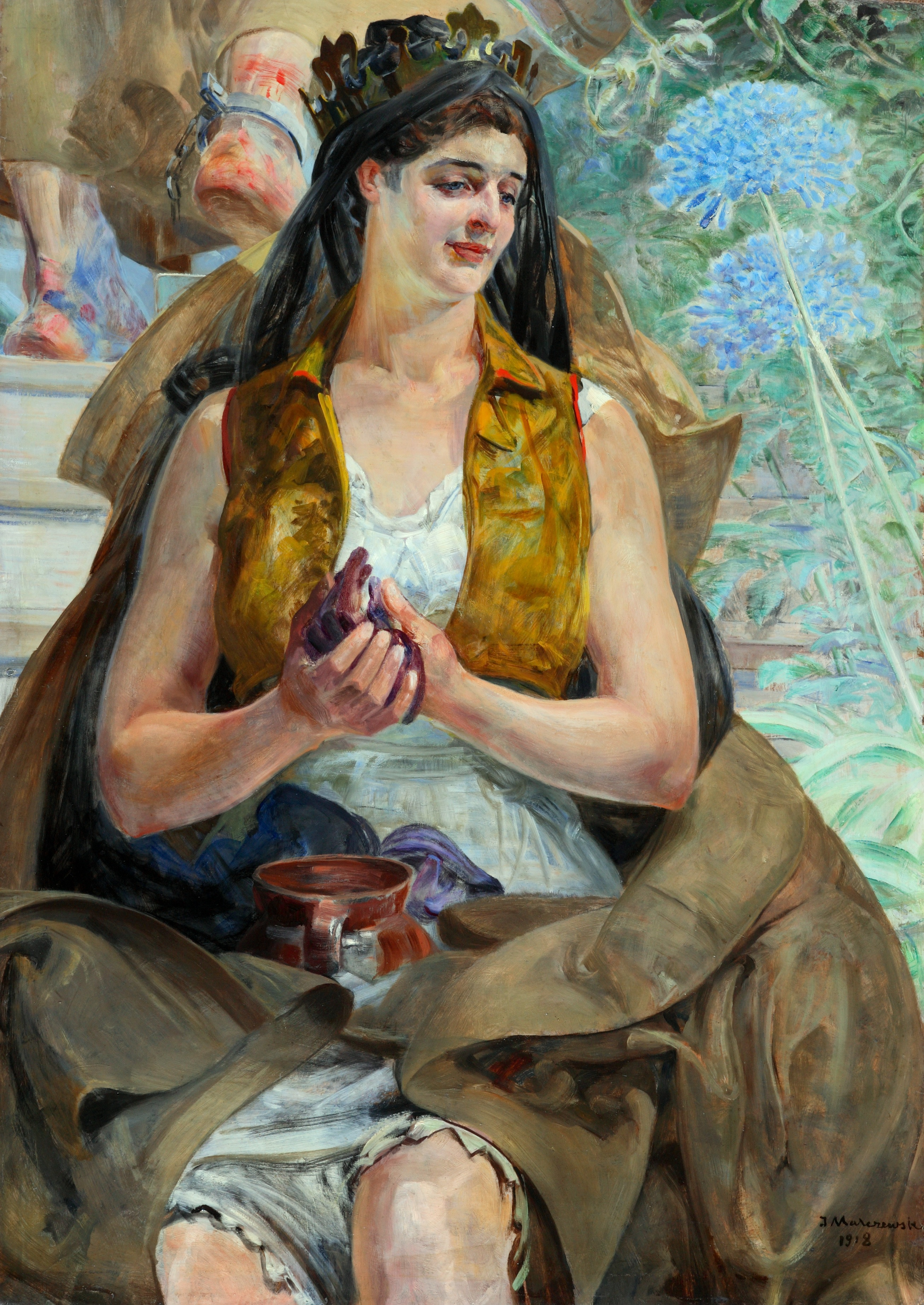
Polonia, a celebrated painting by Jacek Malczewski from 1918, the year of Poland's independence.

Polonia, the name for Poland in Latin and many Romance and other languages, is most often used in modern Polish to refer to the Polish diaspora. However, as can be seen from the image, it was also used as a national personification.

The symbolic depiction of a country as a woman called by the Latin name of that country was common in the 19th century (see Germania, Britannia, Hibernia, Helvetia).

== Personifications of Poland in art ==
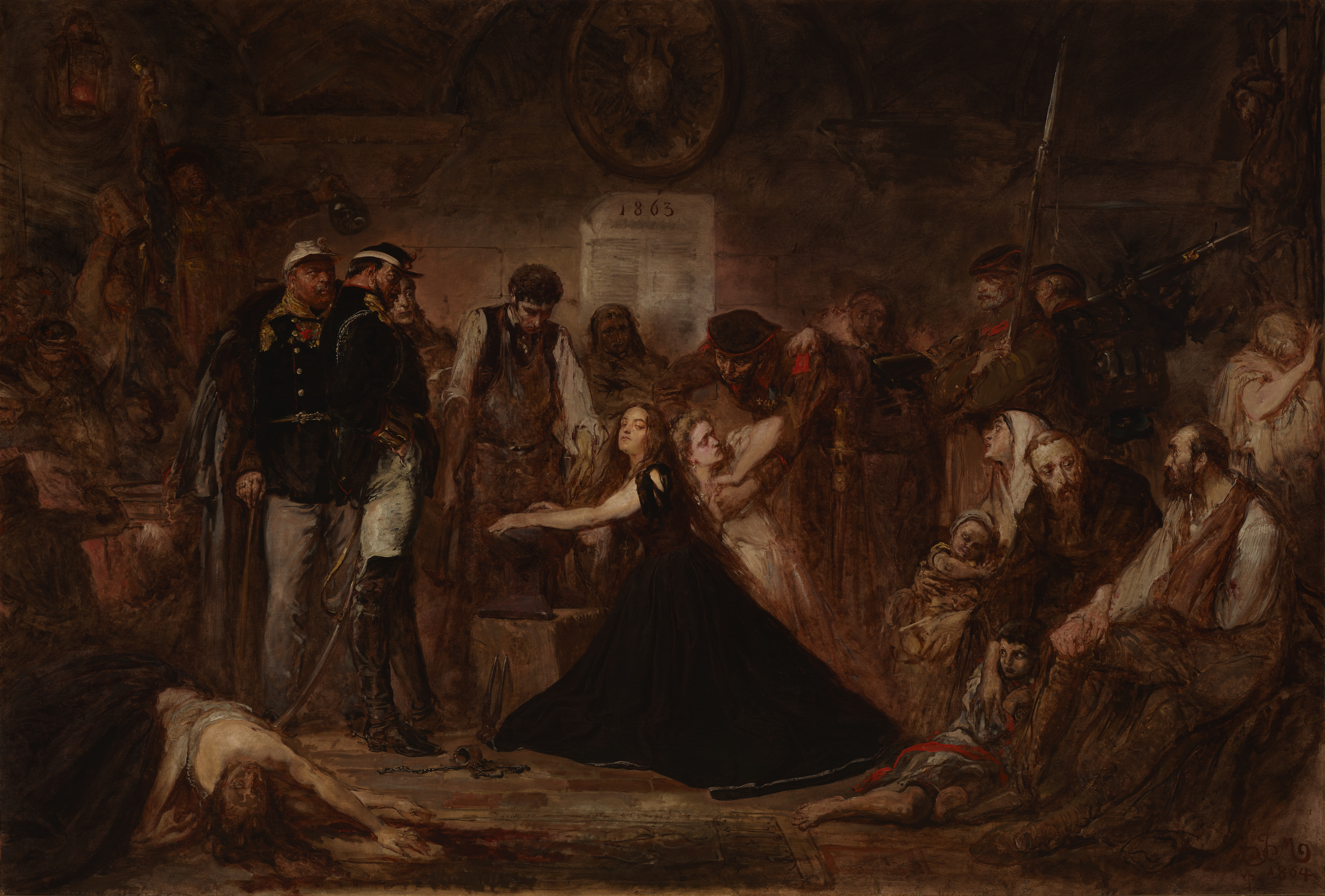
Polonia by Jan Matejko, 1863. Pictured is the aftermath of the failed January Uprising; one of Matejko's most patriotic and symbolic paintings. Captives await exile to Siberia. Russian officers and soldiers supervise a blacksmith placing shackles on a woman representing Polonia. The blonde haired woman next to her represents Lithuania.

- Bernardo Morando Polonia, Old Lublin Gate in Zamość, 1588
- Ary Scheffer Polonia, 1831
- Horace Vernet Polish Prometheus, 1831
- Jan Matejko Polonia, Illustration to Zygmunt Krasiński's "Psalmy Przeszłości" ("Psalms of the past"), 1861
- Artur Grottger Polonia, 1863
- Jan Matejko Rok 1863. Zakuwana Polska ("Year 1863 - Polonia enchained"), 1864
- Jan Styka Polonia, 1890–91
- Stanisław Wyspiański Polonia, 1892–93. Part of stained-glass design for chancel of Latin Cathedral in Lviv/Lwów (in pastel, never realized in glass)
- Jacek Malczewski In the Dust Cloud, 1893
- Jacek Malczewski Hamlet polski - Portret of Aleksander Wielopolski ("Polish Hamlet - Portrait of Aleksander Wielopolski"), 1903
- Jacek Malczewski The Fatherland, 1903
- Włodzimierz Tetmajer Alegoria Polski umarłej ("Allegory of Dead Poland"), St. Nicholas Cathedral in Kalisz, 1909
- Jacek Malczewski Polonia, 1914
- Władysław Skoczylas Polonia, 1915
- Jacek Mierzejewski Polonia, 1915
- Jacek Malczewski Polonia II, 1918
- Leszek Sobocki Polonia, 1982
- Edward Dwurnik Polonia, 1984

== Gallery ==
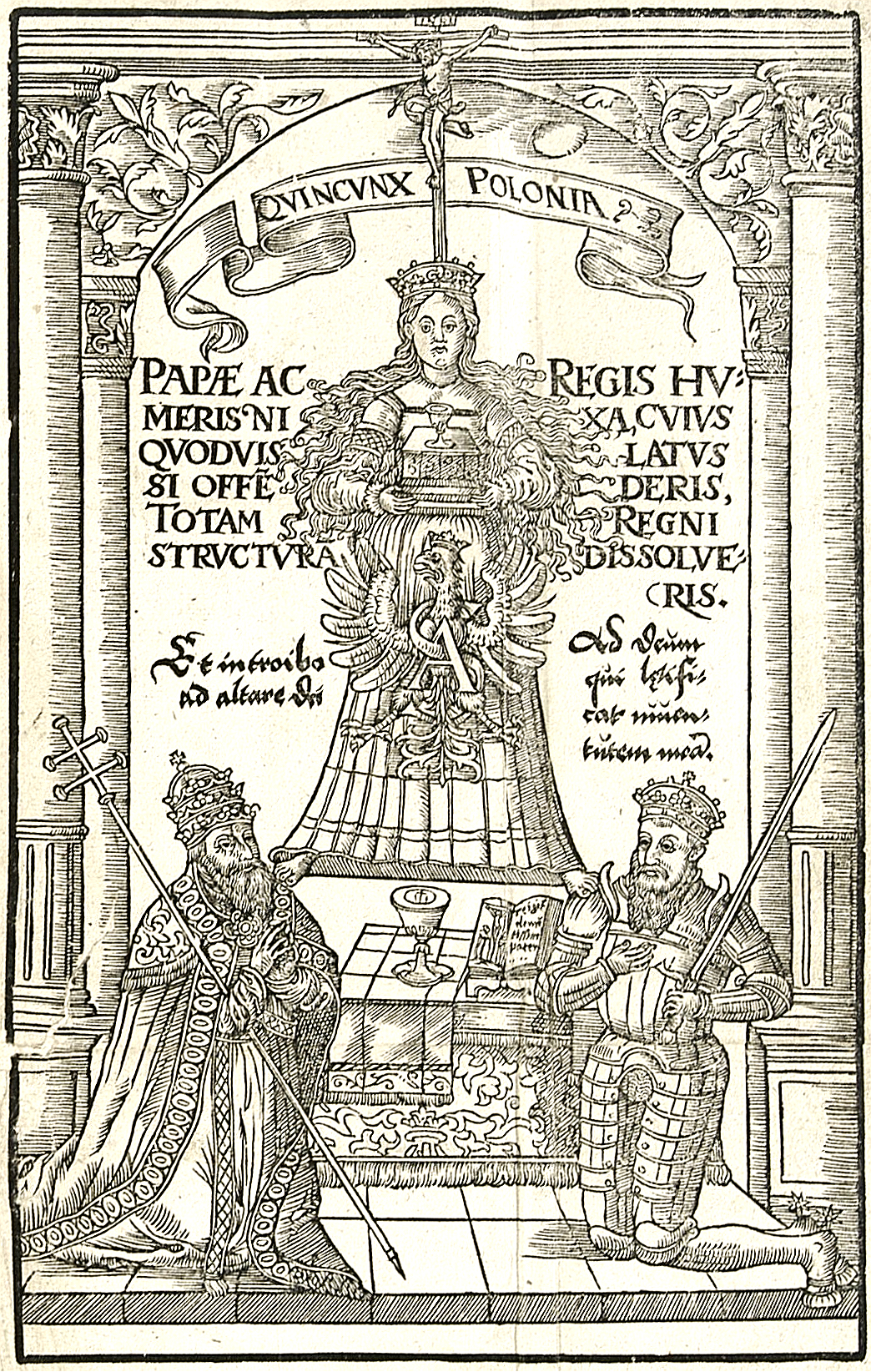
Personification of Poland standing on the shoulders of a pope and a king; from a 16th-century political treatise by Stanisław Orzechowski

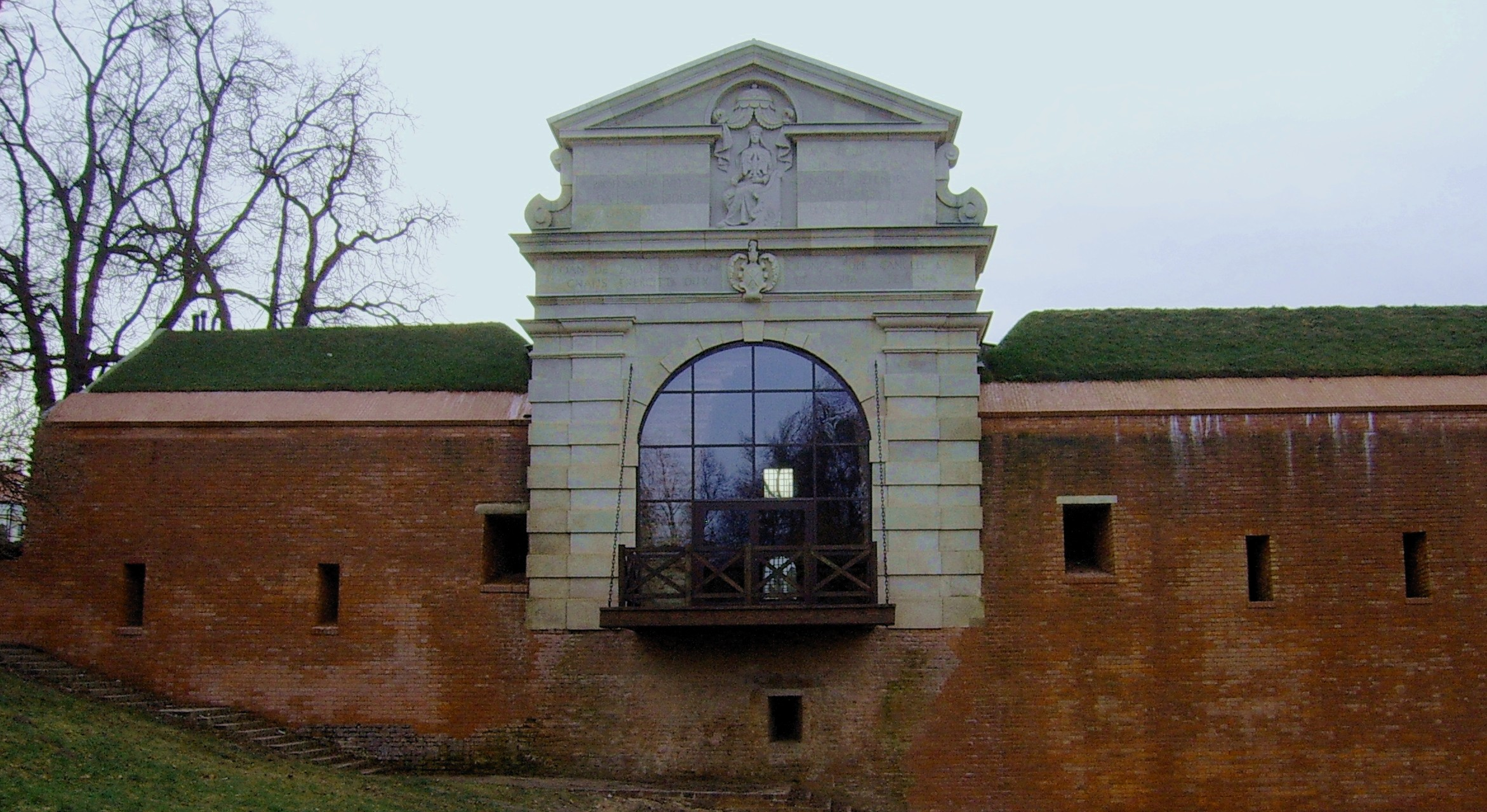
Polonia by Bernardo Morando (1588). Bas-relief at the top of the Old Lublin Gate in Zamość

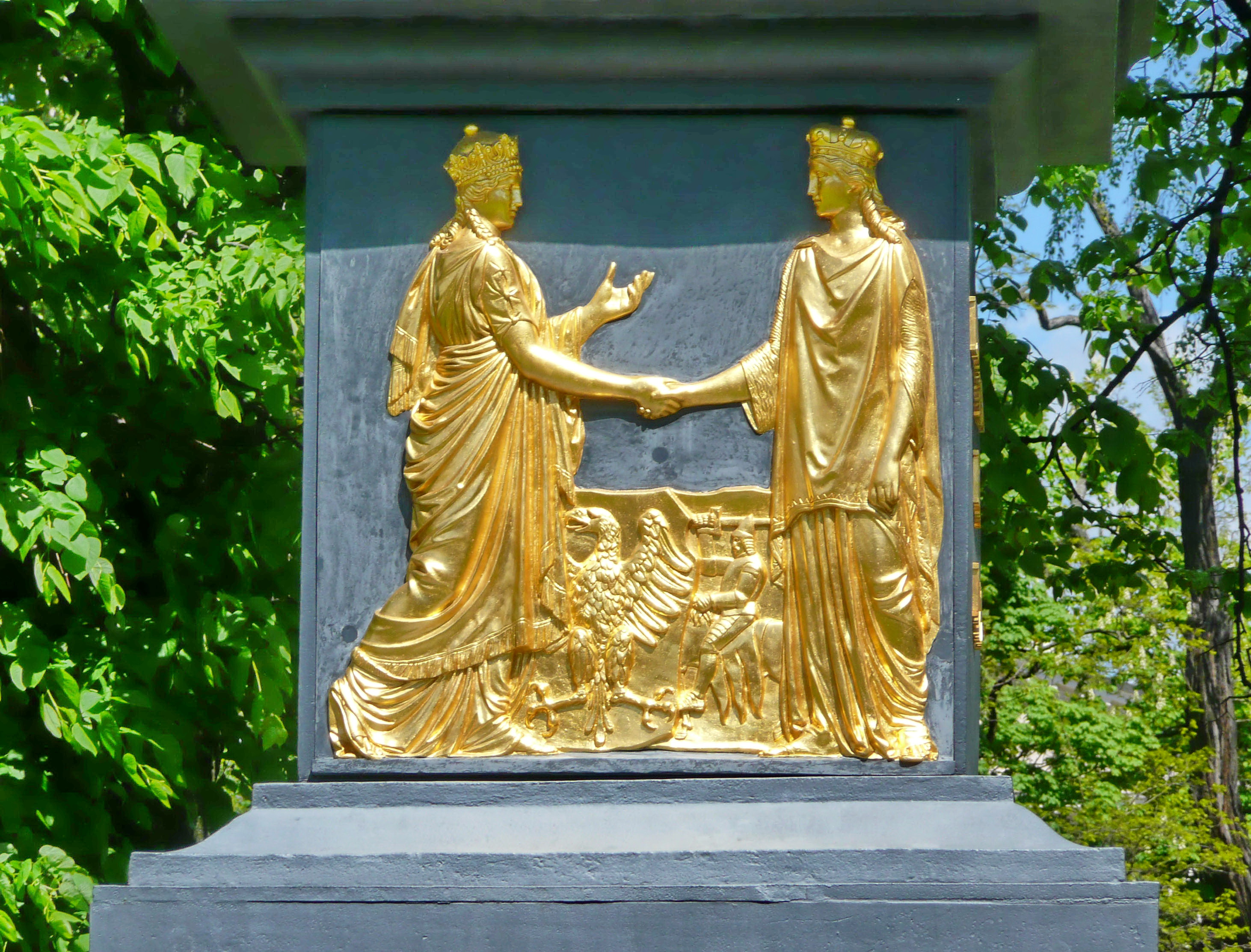
Bas-relief on monument in Lublin commemorating the 1569 union between Poland and Lithuania, Paweł Maliński (1826)

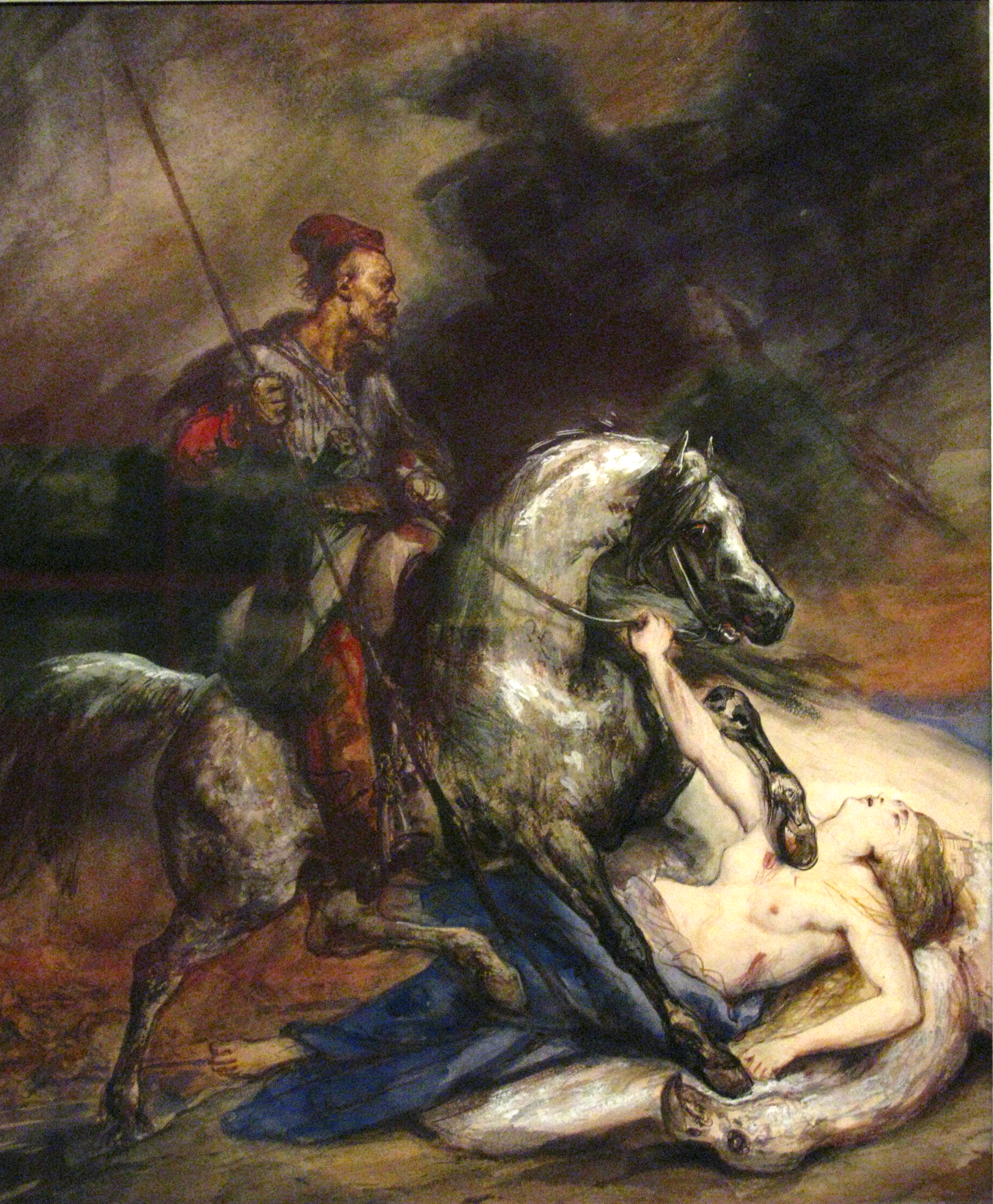
Polonia by Ary Scheffer (1831). Allegory of fall of the November Uprising

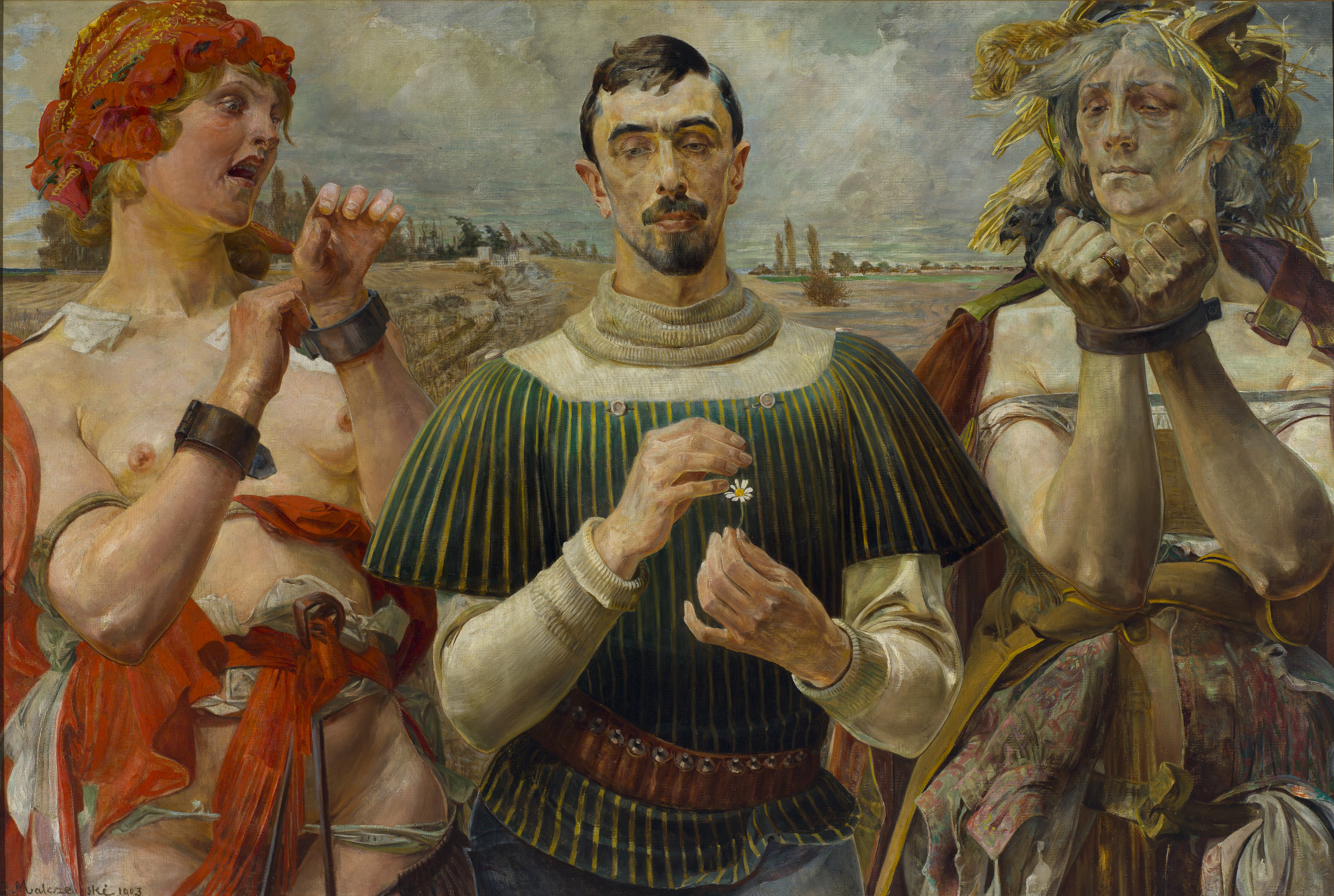
Polish Hamlet. Portrait of Aleksander Wielopolski by Jacek Malczewski (1903). The female figures symbolize young revolutionary Poland and old enslaved Poland

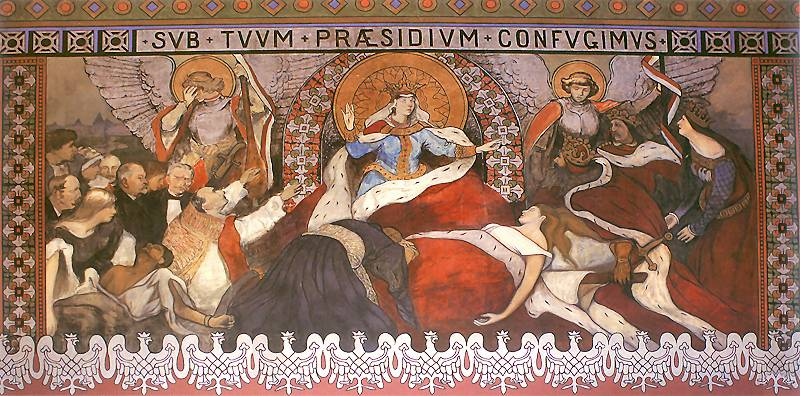
Allegory of Dead Poland by Włodzimierz Tetmajer (1909)

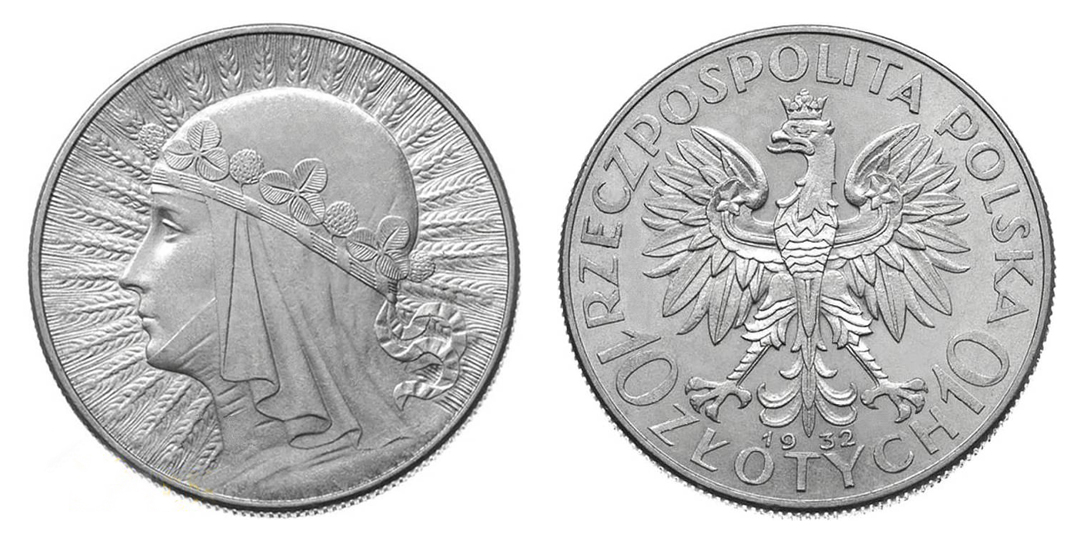
Polonia depicted on a Polish 10 Złoty coin of 1932
