= 1983 in art =

Events from the year 1983 in art.

== Events ==
- Galería OMR commercial contemporary art gallery founded in Mexico City.
- High Museum of Art, designed by Richard Meier, opened in Atlanta, Georgia.
- Australian painter Sidney Nolan settles in Britain at Rodd Court in Herefordshire on the Welsh border near Presteigne.

== Awards ==
- Archibald Prize: Nigel Thomson – Chandler Coventry

== Works ==
- Richard Beyer's Charles Frederic Swigert Jr. Memorial Fountain installed in Oregon Zoo, Portland.
- Completion of the Christo and Jeanne-Claude environmental artwork, Surrounded Islands, involving eleven islands in Biscayne Bay off Miami being surrounded by 6,500,000 square feet (600,000 m^{2}) of pink fabric.
- Lucian Freud - Large Interior W11 (After Watteau)
- Completion of Richard Hamilton's diptych The Citizen.
- Cast of John Seward Johnson II's painted bronze Allow Me installed in Portland, Oregon.
- Marta Minujin - The Parthenon of Books.
- Jean Tinguely and Niki de Saint Phalle's kinetic artwork, the Stravinsky Fountain near the Centre Pompidou, Paris.

== Births ==
- Al-Mayassa bint Hamad Al Thani, Qatari chairperson of the Qatar Museums Authority
- Jérémie Iordanoff, French abstract artist and politician
- Milo Moiré, Swiss performance artist

== Deaths ==
=== January to June ===
- 24 February – Roy Krenkel, American illustrator (b.1918).
- 3 March – Hergé, Belgian comics writer and artist (b.1907).
- 21 May – Kenneth Clark, English author, museum director, broadcaster and art historians (b.1903).
- 11 May – Ernst Thoms, German painter (b. 1896).
- 8 June – Rachel Baes, Belgian painter (b.1912).
- 28 June – Dorothy Annan, English painter, potter, and muralist (b. 1900)

=== July to December ===
- 14 July – Philip Zec, British editorial cartoonist (b. 1909).
- 12 August – Franz Radziwill, German painter (b. 1895).
- 18 August – Sir Nikolaus Pevsner, German-born British art historian (b.1902).
- 28 October – Otto Messmer, American animator (b.1892).
- 5 November – Jean-Marc Reiser, French comics creator (b.1941).
- 17 November – John Russell Harper, Canadian art historian (b.1914).
- 2 December – Aart van den IJssel, Dutch sculptor (b.1922).
- 20 December – Bill Brandt, German-born British photographer and photojournalist (b.1904).
- 23 December – Colin Middleton, Irish artist (b.1910).
- 25 December – Joan Miró, Spanish painter, sculptor and ceramicist (b.1893).
- 26 December – Hans Liska, Austrian-born German artist (b. 1907).

=== Full date unknown ===
- Michael Cardew, English studio potter (b.1901).
- Bernard Lamotte, French illustrator, painter and muralist (b.1903).
- Edward Wesson, English watercolour artist (b.1910).

== See also ==
- 1982 in fine arts of the Soviet Union
- 1983 in fine arts of the Soviet Union
