= 1903 in art =

Events from the year 1903 in art.

== Events ==
- May 4 – Royal Academy Exhibition of 1903 opens at Burlington House in London
- June 3 – Laura Johnson marries Harold Knight.
- Isadora Duncan develops free dance, a dance technique influenced by the ancient Greeks and the philosophy of Friedrich Nietzsche.
- With the support of Pierre-Auguste Renoir, Jacques Villon, Auguste Rodin and others, the first Salon d'Automne opens in Paris as a reaction to the conservatism of the Paris Salon.
- Koloman Moser and Josef Hoffmann found the Wiener Werkstätte in Vienna.
- Frederic Dorr Steele produces his first illustrations for Conan Doyle's Sherlock Holmes stories in the United States, for Collier's Weekly.

== Works ==
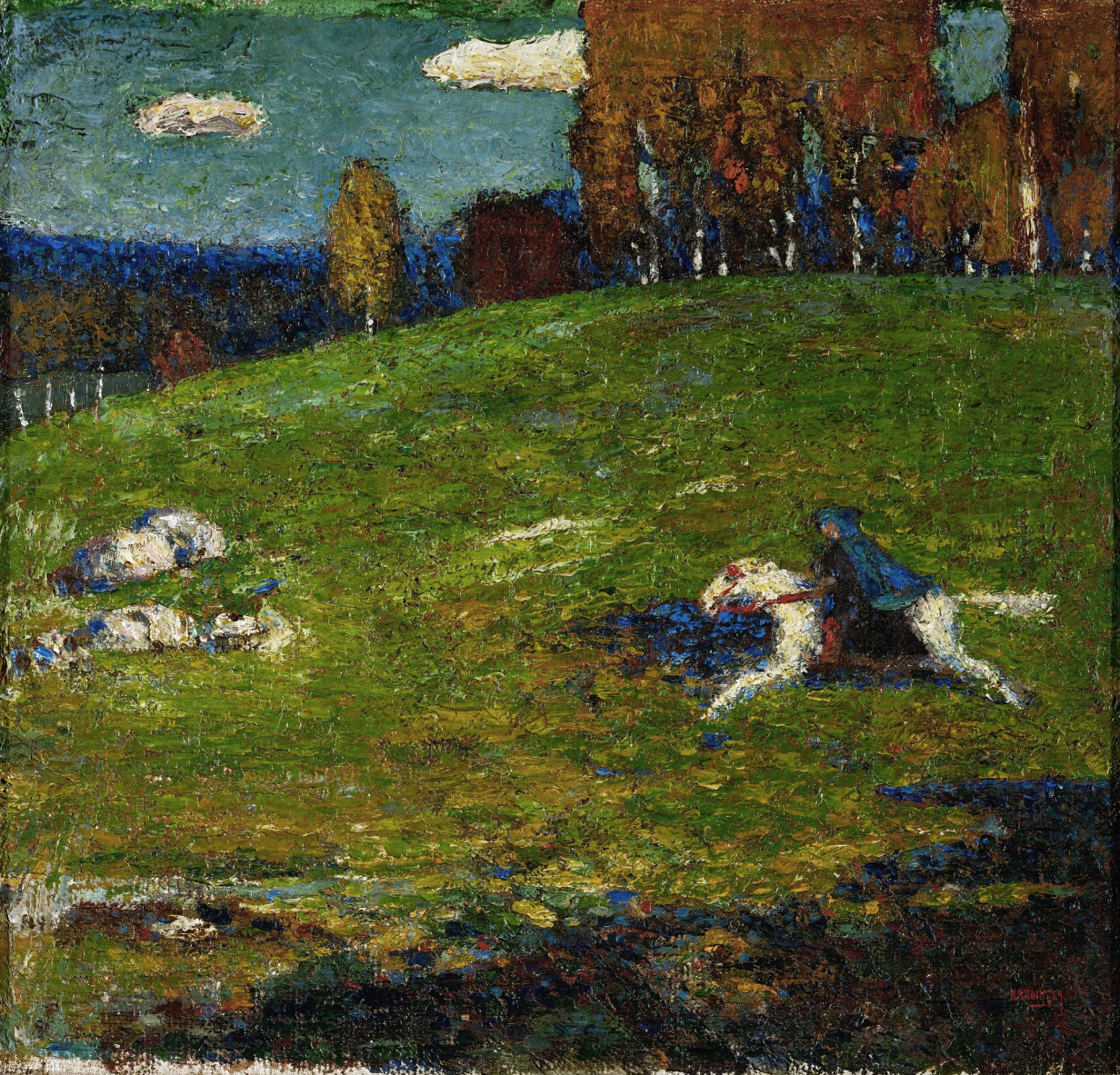
Wassily Kandinsky – Der Blaue Reiter

- John Collier – Lewis Waller as Monsieur Beaucaire
- Cassius Marcellus Coolidge – 16 paintings in Dogs Playing Poker series
- Evelyn De Morgan – The Love Potion
- Frederick H. Evans – A Sea of Steps (from series of platinum prints of photographs of Wells Cathedral)
- Gebhard Fugel and assistants – Panorama of the Crucifixion of Christ (Altötting, Bavaria)
- Jean-Léon Gérôme – Metallurgical Worker and Metallurgical Science
- J. W. Godward
  - The Old, Old Story
  - Summer Flowers
- Wassily Kandinsky – The Blue Rider
- Paul Klee – Inventionen (Inventions) series of etchings, including Jungfrau im Baum (Virgin in a Tree) and Zwei Männer, einander in höherer Stellung vermutend, begegnen sich (Two Men Meet, Each Believing the Other to Be of Higher Rank)
- Peder Severin Krøyer – Sankthansbål på Skagen strand
- Henry Herbert La Thangue – Mowing Bracken
- Margaret MacDonald – Opera Of The Winds (gesso panel)
- Jacek Malczewski
  - Polish Hamlet. Portrait of Aleksander Wielopolski
  - Triptych: Law, Motherland, Art (National Museum, Wrocław)
- Edvard Munch
  - The Brooch, Eva Mudocci (lithograph)
  - Four Girls in Åsgårdstrand
  - Self-Portrait in Hell
  - Village in Moonlight
- Elisabet Ney – Statue of Albert Sidney Johnston (Texas State Cemetery) (sculpture and mausoleum)
- Pablo Picasso – paintings from artist's Blue Period
  - Portrait of Angel Fernández de Soto
  - Tête de femme
  - The Tragedy
  - La vie
  - Vieux guitariste aveugle (The Old Guitar Player)
- Camille Pissarro – Self-portrait (Tate Gallery)
- Sir Edward Poynter – The Cave of the Storm Nymphs (private collection)
- Tom Roberts – The Big Picture (formally, The Opening of the First Parliament of the Commonwealth of Australia by H.R.H. The Duke of Cornwall and York (later H.M. King George V), May 9, 1901)
- Augustus Saint-Gaudens – Henry W. Maxwell Memorial
- John Singer Sargent – Mrs. Fiske Warren (Gretchen Osgood) and Her Daughter Rachel
- Hugo Simberg – The Wounded Angel
- Max Slevogt – The Singer Francisco D'Andrade as Don Giovanni in Mozart's Opera ("The Black d'Andrade")
- Philip Wilson Steer – Richmond Castle
- August Strindberg – Staden
- Abbott Handerson Thayer – Stevenson Memorial
- Félix Vallotton – The Five Painters
- J. W. Waterhouse
  - Boreas
  - Echo and Narcissus

== Publications ==
- Bernard Berenson – The Drawings of the Florentine Painters
- Anna Muthesius – Das Eigenkleid der Frau

== Births ==
=== January to June ===
- January – Guan Zilan, Chinese avant-garde painter (d. 1986)
- January 10 – Barbara Hepworth, English sculptor and artist (d. 1975)
- January 19 – Sir Alfred Beit, 2nd Baronet, British politician, art collector and philanthropist and honorary Irish citizen (d. 1994)
- March 7 – Maud Lewis, Canadian folk artist (d. 1970)
- March 10 – Edward Bawden, English artist and illustrator (d. 1989)
- March 14
  - Richard Eurich, English sea- and landscape painter (d. 1992)
  - Adolph Gottlieb, American abstract expressionist painter and sculptor (d. 1974)
- April 3 – Lola Álvarez Bravo, Mexican photographer (d. 1993)
- April 16 – Thomas Hennell, English painter (k. 1945)
- May 7 – Paul Ninas, American painter (d. 1964)
- June 6 – Ceri Richards, Welsh painter (d. 1971)
- June 15 – Victor Brauner, Romanian painter (d. 1966)
- June 21 – Al Hirschfeld, American caricaturist (d. 2003)

=== July to December ===
- July 13 – Kenneth Clark, English author, museum director, broadcaster and art historian (d.1983)
- July 16 – Tore Asplund, Swedish-born American painter (d.1977)
- July 21 – Roy Neuberger, American art collector and patron (d.2010)
- July 22 – Eric Ravilious, English artist (d.1942)
- August 14 – Lodewijk Bruckman, Dutch magic realist painter (d.1995)
- August 24 – Graham Sutherland, English artist (d.1980)
- September 16 – Karl Zerbe, German-born painter (d.1972)
- September 20 – Gertrud Arndt, German photographer (d.2000)
- September 25 – Mark Rothko, Latvian-born American painter and printmaker (d.1970)
- September 29 – Walter Inglis Anderson, American painter (d.1965)
- October 15 – Otto Bettmann, German-born image archivist (d.1998)
- October 22 – Zlatyu Boyadzhiev, Bulgarian painter (d.1976)
- October 24 – Charlotte Perriand, French architect and designer (d.1999)
- October 25 – Harry Shoulberg, American expressionist painter] (d.1995)
- November 3 – Walker Evans, American photographer (d.1975)
- December 13 – John Piper, English painter (d.1992)
- December 24 – Joseph Cornell, American artist and sculptor (d.1972)
- December 30 – Candido Portinari, Brazilian painter (d.1962)
- date unknown – Bernard Lamotte, French illustrator, painter and muralist (d.1983)

== Deaths ==
- January 5 – Eleuterio Pagliano, Italian painter (b. 1826)
- January 24 – Charles Wynne Nicholls, genre painter (b. 1831)
- March 10 – Sophie Gengembre Anderson, genre painter (b. 1843)
- April 24 – Walter Osborne, Irish impressionist painter (b.1859)
- May 9 – Paul Gauguin, painter (b. 1848)
- June 8 – Robert Frederick Blum, American illustrator and lithographer (b. 1857)
- July 14 – James McNeill Whistler, American painter and etcher (b. 1834)
- August 17 – Hans Gude, painter (b. 1825)
- September 13 – Carl Schuch, painter (b. 1846)
- October 18 – John Callcott Horsley, painter (b. 1817)
- October 26 – János Fadrusz, Hungarian sculptor (b. 1858)
- November 13 – Camille Pissarro, Impressionist painter (b. 1830)
