= 1982 in fine arts of the Soviet Union =

The year 1982 was marked by many events that left an imprint on the history of Soviet and Russian Fine Arts.

== Events ==
- Traditional Exhibition of works of Leningrad artists - the Great Patriotic War veterans was opened in the Leningrad Union of Artists on the eve of Victory Day (9 May). The participants were Piotr Alberti, Ivan Andreev, Andrei Bantikov, Nikolai Baskakov, Vladimir Chekalov, Alexei Eriomin, Mikhail Kaneev, Yuri Khukhrov, Maya Kopitseva, Gevork Kotiantz, Mikhail Kozell, Boris Lavrenko, Dmitry Maevsky, Gavriil Malish, Evsey Moiseenko, Nikolai Mukho, Piotr Nazarov, Sergei Osipov, Evgeny Pozdniakov, Gleb Savinov, Alexander Shmidt, German Tatarinov, Nikolai Timkov, Ivan Varichev, Anatoli Vasiliev, Piotr Vasiliev, Nikolai Volodimirov, Rostislav Vovkushevsky, Ruben Zakharian, and other important Leningrad artists.
- Exhibition of works by Boris Ugarov was opened in the Russian museum in Leningrad.
- Exhibition of works by Evsey Moiseenko was opened in the Russian museum in Leningrad.
- Exhibition of works by Nikolai Timkov was opened in the House of Artists in Moscow shown later both in the Air Force Academy after Yuri Gagarin and in the Star City.
- Exhibition of works by Igor Skorobogatov was opened in the Leningrad Union of Artists.
- Exhibition of works by Lydia Milova was opened in the Leningrad Union of Artists.
- Exhibition of works by Lev Bogomolets was opened in the Leningrad Union of Artists.
- Exhibition of works by Andrei Kochetkov was opened in the Leningrad Union of Artists.
- Exhibition of works by Alexander Stolbov was opened in the Leningrad Union of Artists.

== Deaths ==
- April 19 — Nikita Medovikov (Russian: Медовиков Никита Петрович), Russian soviet painter and art educator (born 1918).
- May 12 — Alexander Zaytsev (Russian: Зайцев Александр Дмитриевич), Russian soviet painter and art educator (born 1903).
- August 27 — Boris Ermolaev (Russian: Ермолаев Борис Николаевич), Russian soviet graphic artist and painter (born 1903).

== See also ==
- List of Russian artists
- List of painters of Leningrad Union of Artists
- Saint Petersburg Union of Artists
- Russian culture

== Sources ==
- Выставка произведений ленинградских художников, посвященная 50-летию ЛОСХ РСФСР. Каталог. Л., Художник РСФСР, 1982.
- Борис Сергеевич Угаров. Выставка произведений. Каталог. Л., Художник РСФСР, 1982.
- Лия Александровна Милова. Выставка произведений. Каталог. Л., Художник РСФСР, 1982.
- Александр Сергеевич Столбов. Выставка произведений. Каталог. Л., ЛОСХ РСФСР, 1982.
- Николай Николаевич Брандт. Выставка произведений. Каталог. Л., Художник РСФСР, 1982.
- Лев Константинович Богомолец. Выставка произведений. Каталог. Л., Художник РСФСР, 1982.
- Соломон Борисович Эпштейн. Выставка произведений. Каталог. Л., Художник РСФСР, 1982.
- Коростелев Петр Гурьевич. Выставка произведений. Каталог. Л., Художник РСФСР, 1982.
- Кочетков Андрей Дмитриевич. Выставка произведений. Каталог. Л., Художник РСФСР, 1982.
- Akademichka. The Academic Dacha through the eyes of Nikolai Timkov. The Pushkin Group and the Timkov Collection, 1999.
- Скоробогатов Игорь Константинович. Выставка произведений. Каталог.. Л., Художник РСФСР, 1982.
- Artists of Peoples of the USSR. Biobibliography Dictionary. Vol. 1. Moscow, Iskusstvo, 1970.
- Artists of Peoples of the USSR. Biobibliography Dictionary. Vol. 2. Moscow, Iskusstvo, 1972.
- Directory of Members of Union of Artists of USSR. Volume 1,2. Moscow, Soviet Artist Edition, 1979.
- Directory of Members of the Leningrad branch of the Union of Artists of Russian Federation. Leningrad, Khudozhnik RSFSR, 1980.
- Artists of Peoples of the USSR. Biobibliography Dictionary. Vol. 4 Book 1. Moscow, Iskusstvo, 1983.
- Directory of Members of the Leningrad branch of the Union of Artists of Russian Federation. - Leningrad: Khudozhnik RSFSR, 1987.
- Artists of peoples of the USSR. Biobibliography Dictionary. Vol. 4 Book 2. - Saint Petersburg: Academic project humanitarian agency, 1995.
- Link of Times: 1932 - 1997. Artists - Members of Saint Petersburg Union of Artists of Russia. Exhibition catalogue. - Saint Petersburg: Manezh Central Exhibition Hall, 1997.
- Matthew C. Bown. Dictionary of 20th Century Russian and Soviet Painters 1900-1980s. - London: Izomar, 1998.
- Vern G. Swanson. Soviet Impressionism. - Woodbridge, England: Antique Collectors' Club, 2001.
- Петр Фомин. Живопись. Воспоминания современников. СПб., 2002. С.107.
- Время перемен. Искусство 1960—1985 в Советском Союзе. СПб., Государственный Русский музей, 2006.
- Sergei V. Ivanov. Unknown Socialist Realism. The Leningrad School. - Saint-Petersburg: NP-Print Edition, 2007. - ISBN 5-901724-21-6, ISBN 978-5-901724-21-7.
- Anniversary Directory graduates of Saint Petersburg State Academic Institute of Painting, Sculpture, and Architecture named after Ilya Repin, Russian Academy of Arts. 1915 - 2005. - Saint Petersburg: Pervotsvet Publishing House, 2007.
