= 1983 in fine arts of the Soviet Union =

The year 1983 was marked by many events that left an imprint on the history of Soviet and Russian Fine Arts.

== Events ==
- Traditional Exhibition of works of Leningrad artists - the Great Patriotic War veterans was opened in the Leningrad Union of Artists on the eve of Victory Day (9 May). The participants were Piotr Alberti, Ivan Andreev, Andrei Bantikov, Nikolai Baskakov, Vladimir Chekalov, Evgeny Chuprun, Mikhail Grachev, Alexei Eriomin, Mikhail Kaneev, Yuri Khukhrov, Maya Kopitseva, Elena Kostenko, Gevork Kotiantz, Mikhail Kozell, Boris Lavrenko, Dmitry Maevsky, Gavriil Malish, Evsey Moiseenko, Nikolai Mukho, Piotr Nazarov, Anatoli Nenartovich, Yuri Neprintsev, Dmitry Oboznenko, Sergei Osipov, Vladimir Ovchinnikov, Evgeny Pozdniakov, Gleb Savinov, Alexander Shmidt, German Tatarinov, Nikolai Timkov, Ivan Varichev, Anatoli Vasiliev, Piotr Vasiliev, Nikolai Volodimirov, Rostislav Vovkushevsky, Vecheslav Zagonek, Ruben Zakharian, and other important Leningrad artists.
- Exhibition of works by Piotr Fomin was opened in the Russian museum in Leningrad.
- Painter Boris Ugarov was elected President of the Academy of Arts of the USSR.
- Exhibition of works by Mikhail Natarevich (1907–1979) was opened in the Leningrad Union of Artists.
- Exhibition of works by Leonid Tkachenko was opened in the Leningrad Union of Artists.
- Exhibition of works by Sergei Osipov was opened in the Exhibition Halls of the Union of Artists of Russian Federation in Moscow.

== Gallery ==
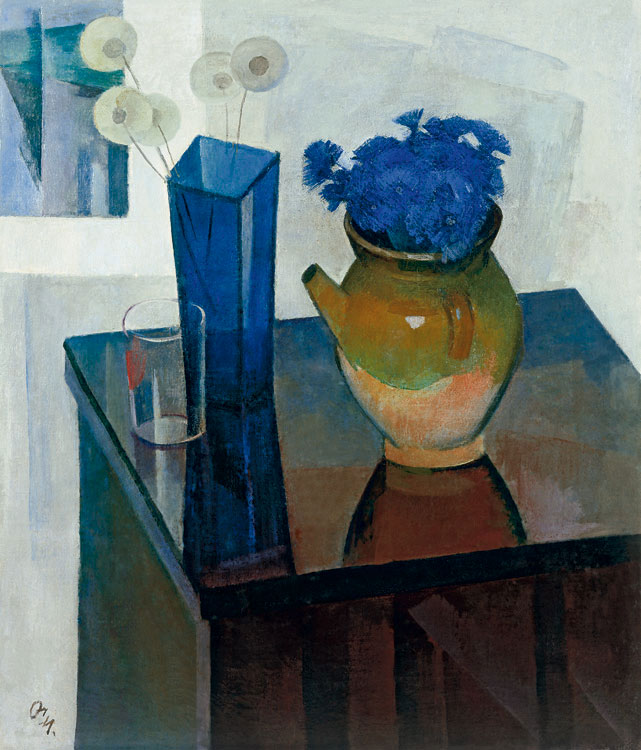
Cornflowers. 1976

== Deaths ==
- March 6 — Mikhail Kaneev (Russian: Канеев Михаил Александрович), Russian soviet painter and art educator, Honored Art worker of Russian Federation (born 1923).
- March 29 — Mikhail Kopeykin (Russian: Копейкин Михаил Семёнович), Russian soviet painter and art educator (born 1905).
- April 6 — Nikolai Babasuk (Russian: Бабасюк Николай Лукич), Russian soviet painter and art educator (born 1914).
- April 27 — Yuri Tulin (Russian: Тулин Юрий Нилович), Russian soviet painter and graphic artist, Honored Art worker of Russian Federation, Honored Artist of the RSFSR (born 1921).
- November 16 — Samuil Nevelshtein (Russian: Невельштейн Самуил Григорьевич), soviet painter and graphic artist (born 1903).
- November 18 — Georgy Kalinkin (Russian: Калинкин Георгий Алексеевич), Russian soviet painter and graphic artist (born 1915).
- November 24 — Anatoli Yar-Kravchenko, (Russian: ru:Яр-Кравченко, Анатолий Никифорович), Russian soviet painter and graphic artist, People's Artist of the RSFSR, Stalin Prize winner (born 1911).

== See also ==
- List of Russian artists
- List of painters of Leningrad Union of Artists
- Saint Petersburg Union of Artists
- Russian culture

== Sources ==
- Шевчук С. Смотреть жизни в лицо. Заметки о живописном разделе выставки ленинградских художников в Манеже // Смена, 1983, 28 декабря.
- Сергей Иванович Осипов. Живопись. Рисунок. Каталог. М., Советский художник, 1983.
- Леонид Анисимович Ткаченко. Выставка произведений. Каталог. Л., Художник РСФСР, 1983.
- Выставка произведений художников - ветеранов Великой Отечественной войны. Май 1983 года. Каталог. Л., ЛГИ, 1983.
- Фомин Петр Тимофеевич. Выставка произведений. Каталог. Л., Художник РСФСР, 1983.
- Фрумак Рувим Залманович. Выставка произведений. Каталог. Л., Художник РСФСР, 1983.
- Захарьян Рубен Агасьевич. Выставка произведений. Каталог. Л., Художник РСФСР, 1983.
- Байкова Евгения Васильевна. Выставка произведений. Каталог. Л., Художник РСФСР, 1983.
- Михаил Давидович Натаревич. Выставка произведений. Каталог. Л., Художник РСФСР, 1982.
- Анна Адександровна Кострова. Николай Иванович Костров. Графика. Каталог выставки. М., Советский художник, 1983.
- Назина Вера Ивановна. Выставка произведений. Каталог. Л., ЛОСХ РСФСР, 1983.
- Ярослав Игоревич Крестовский. Выставка произведений. Каталог. Л., Художник РСФСР, 1983.
- Миссуловина Виктория Яковлевна. Выставка произведений. Каталог. Л., ЛОСХ РСФСР, 1983.
- Шаманов Борис Иванович. Живопись. Каталог. М., Советский художник, 1983.
- Artists of Peoples of the USSR. Biobibliography Dictionary. Vol. 1. Moscow, Iskusstvo, 1970.
- Artists of Peoples of the USSR. Biobibliography Dictionary. Vol. 2. Moscow, Iskusstvo, 1972.
- Directory of Members of Union of Artists of USSR. Volume 1,2. Moscow, Soviet Artist Edition, 1979.
- Directory of Members of the Leningrad branch of the Union of Artists of Russian Federation. Leningrad, Khudozhnik RSFSR, 1980.
- Artists of Peoples of the USSR. Biobibliography Dictionary. Vol. 4 Book 1. Moscow, Iskusstvo, 1983.
- Directory of Members of the Leningrad branch of the Union of Artists of Russian Federation. - Leningrad: Khudozhnik RSFSR, 1987.
- Artists of peoples of the USSR. Biobibliography Dictionary. Vol. 4 Book 2. - Saint Petersburg: Academic project humanitarian agency, 1995.
- Link of Times: 1932 - 1997. Artists - Members of Saint Petersburg Union of Artists of Russia. Exhibition catalogue. - Saint Petersburg: Manezh Central Exhibition Hall, 1997.
- Matthew C. Bown. Dictionary of 20th Century Russian and Soviet Painters 1900-1980s. - London: Izomar, 1998.
- Vern G. Swanson. Soviet Impressionism. - Woodbridge, England: Antique Collectors' Club, 2001.
- Петр Фомин. Живопись. Воспоминания современников. СПб., 2002. С.107.
- Время перемен. Искусство 1960—1985 в Советском Союзе. СПб., Государственный Русский музей, 2006.
- Sergei V. Ivanov. Unknown Socialist Realism. The Leningrad School. - Saint-Petersburg: NP-Print Edition, 2007. - ISBN 5-901724-21-6, ISBN 978-5-901724-21-7.
- Anniversary Directory graduates of Saint Petersburg State Academic Institute of Painting, Sculpture, and Architecture named after Ilya Repin, Russian Academy of Arts. 1915 - 2005. - Saint Petersburg: Pervotsvet Publishing House, 2007.
