= Sędziejowice, Świętokrzyskie Voivodeship =

Sędziejowice
- Village
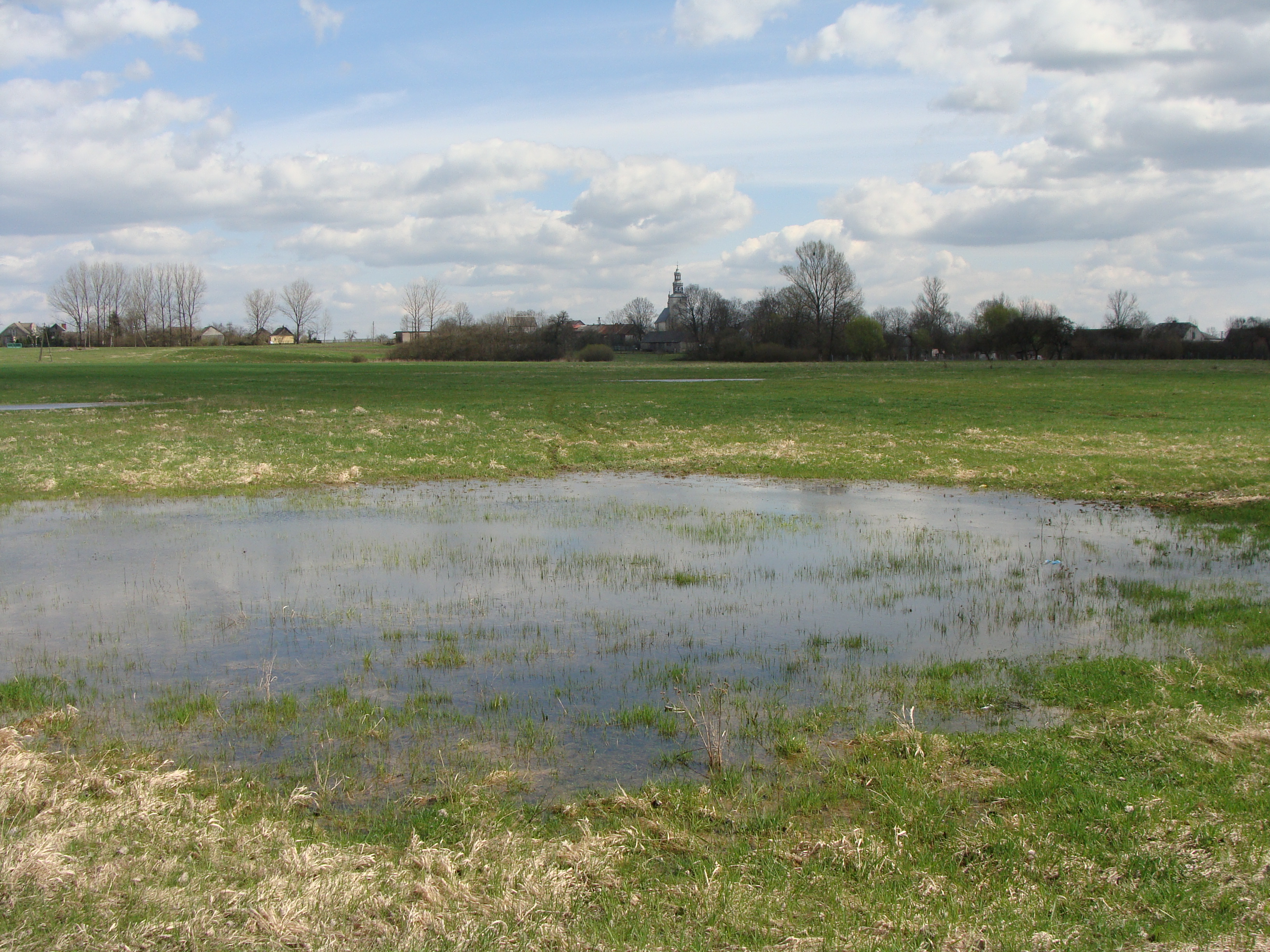

- Location within Poland
- Coordinates: 50°34′47″N 20°38′58″E
- Country: Poland
- Voivodeship: Świętokrzyskie
- County: Kielce
- Gmina: Chmielnik
- Population: 460

Sędziejowice [sɛnd͡ʑɛjɔˈvit͡sɛ] is a village in the administrative district of Gmina Chmielnik, within Kielce County, Świętokrzyskie Voivodeship, in south-central Poland. It lies approximately 8 km (5 mi) south-west of Chmielnik and 34 km (21 mi) south of the regional capital Kielce.

== Notable people ==
- Aleksander Wielopolski (1803 in Sędziejowice - 1877 in Dresden) a Polish aristocrat who served as the Chief of the Civil Administration under Tsar Alexander II as well as owner of large estates and the 13th lord of the manor of Pińczów.
