= Teresa Gierzyńska =

Polish contemporary artist (1947)

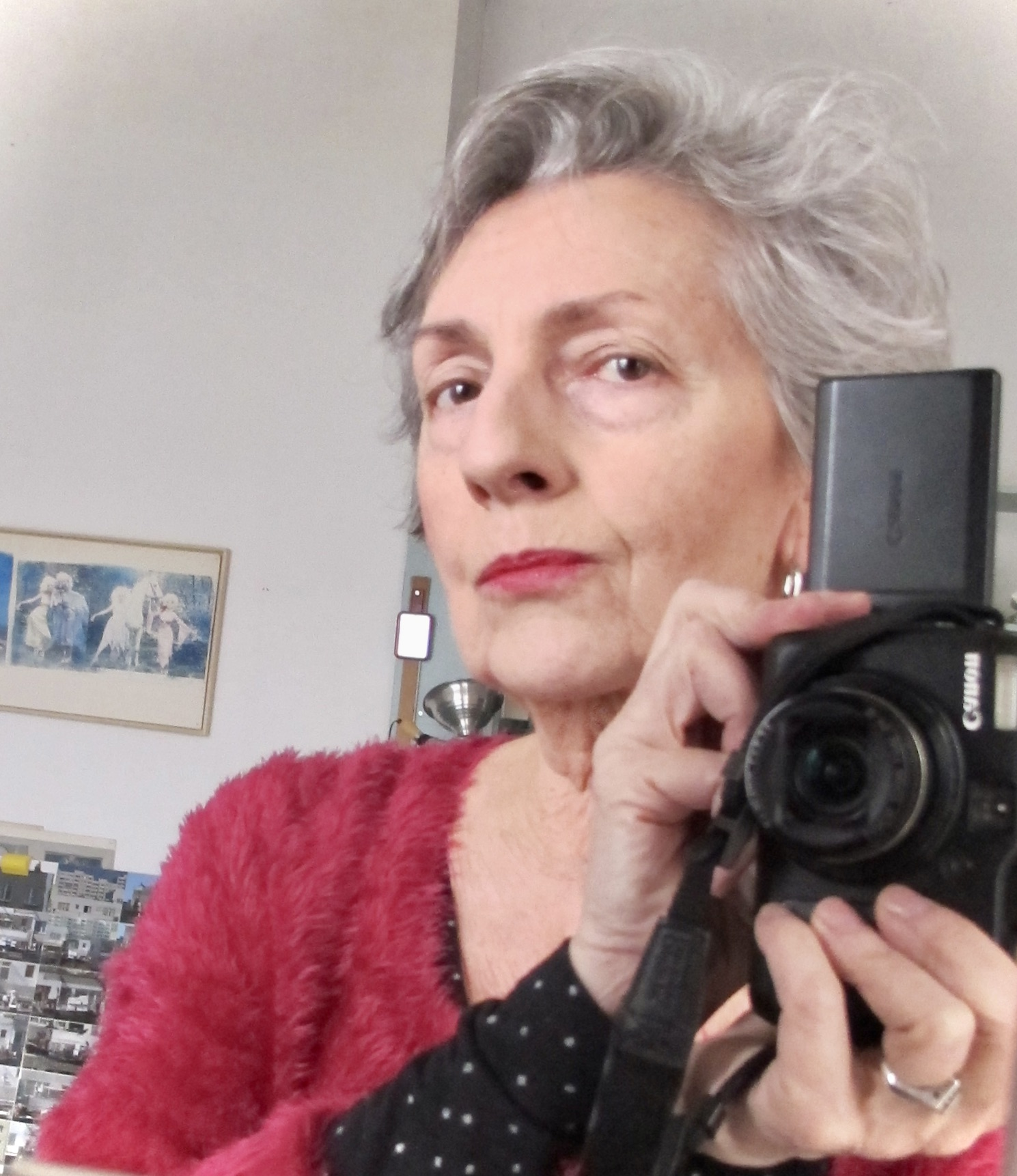
- Born: 1947. Rypin
- Education: Academy of Fine Arts, Warsaw
- Awards: The Maria Anto & Elsa von Freytag-Laringhoven Art Prize 2019

Teresa Gierzyńska (born 1947 in Rypin) is a Polish artist, photographer, and recipient of the 2019 Maria Anto & Elsa von Freytag-Laringhoven Art Prize.

== Life ==
Gierzyńska graduated from the Academy of Fine Arts in Warsaw (1971), where she studied sculpture along with solids and planes design in Oskar Hansen's studio.

Since 1962, Gierzyńska has worked with broadly understood photography and techniques of photography multiplying and processing. In 1964, she went to Canada for a year to pursue artistic education. In her work, Gierzyńska draws on family archives, found photographs, postcards, and press photographs. She creates multiple series, including: About Her, Travels, and About Light. Between 1967 and 2003, Gierzyńska documented the life and work of her husband, Edward Dwurnik, with whom she had a daughter, Pola Dwurnik (b. 1979). Their marriage ended in divorce after thirty-seven years. Gierzyńska presented her drawings, graphics, and photographs in numerous solo and group exhibitions.

Public collections that hold Gierzyńska's works include the Museum in Gliwice, Muzeum Sztuki in Łódź, Ujazdowski Castle Centre for Contemporary Art in Warsaw, the Museum of Modern Art in Warsaw, Teatr Studio in Warsaw, The Art Institute of Chicago, the Centre Pompidou in Paris, the Kontakt Collection in Vienna, as well as various private collections in Poland and abroad.

Gierzyńska lives and works in Warsaw.

== Notable exhibitions ==
1969 – Drawing – Interior, Galeria Klubu Medyk, Warsaw with Edward Dwurnik and Przemysław Kwiek

1970:

- Young Polish Sculpture in Plein-Air, Legnica
- Graphics (Memories), DAP, Warsaw (solo exhibition)

1978:

- I International Triennale of Drawing, Wrocław
- The National Biennale of Young Art, BWA, Sopot

1979:

- Erotyka, DAP Warsaw
- Erotyzm BWA Sopot
- Polsk Kunst, Kobenhavns Radhus, Copenhagen

1981 – ONA ONO JA (She It I), Galeria Ściana Wschodnia, Warsaw (solo exhibition)

1986 – Ninth British International Print Biennale, Bradford, Victoria and Albert Museum, London

1988:

- L’Immagine delle Donne, Rassegna Fotografica Europea, Siena and Buonconvento (SI)
- Polish Perceptions – Ten Contemporary Photographers 1977–88, Collins Gallery, Glasgow
- 2 Bienal Internacional de Electrografia y Copy Art, Valencia

1989 – Looks/Impressions, from the collection of Muzeum Sztuki in Łódź, Muzeum Sztuki, Łódź

1990:

- Looking East, Aarhus Festuge, Galleri Image, Aarhus
- O niej. Czarne, białe i zielone (About Her. Black, White, and Green), Galeria FF, Łódź (solo exhibition)

1991 – Cienie i zakryte ciało… (Shadows and the Covered Body...), Mała Galeria ZPAF-CSW, Warsaw (solo exhibition)

1992 – Europa unden Rammer, Aarhus Festuge, Galleri Image, Aarhus

1993:

- T.G., Galeria ZPAF, Krakow (solo exhibition)
- I Biennale Małych Form Fotograficznych, Galeria Miejska BWA, Poznań

2002 – Wystawa jubileuszowa (Anniversary Exhibition), Mała Galeria ZPAF-CSW, Warsaw

2004:

- Four Pictures, Mała Galeria ZPAF-CSW, Warsaw (solo exhibition)

2007:

- Icons of Victory, MCSW "Elektrownia," Radom
- Time Saved 1977–2006, Ujazdowski Castle Centre for Contemporary Art, Warsaw
- The Essence of Things, Czarna Gallery, Warsaw (solo exhibition)

2009

- About Her: Photographs from 1967 to 2008, Arton Foundation, Warsaw (solo exhibition)
- Fotografia Kolekcjonerska 5 edycja (Collector Photography 5th edition), Artinfo.pl and Galeria ART+on, Warsaw
- Viennafair 2009, Vienna (with Czarna Gallery)
- SIEGesIKONen transFORM, Humboldt Umspannwerk, Berlin
- Sztuka czasu kryzysu (The Art of Crisis), Lewicka 10, Warsaw
- Paris Photo, Spotlight on Central Europe, Carrousel du Louvre, Paris (with Czarna Gallery)

2012 – Chora sztuka (Ill Art), Warsaw, the IV floor of the former children's hospital (al. Jerozolimskie 57, Warsaw)

2014:

- By the River That Isn't, BWA Sokół, Nowy Sącz (solo exhibition)
- Touch, Pola Magnetyczne 7, Warsaw (solo exhibition)

2014/2015 – Architecture of the Shadow: Chatels and Bazaars, Museum of Modern Art, Warsaw

2016 – Miłosny Performans (Love Performance), Zofia Krawiec, Galeria Labirynt, Lublin

2017 – Moods, Galeria Farbiarnia, Bydgoszcz, Vintage Photo Festival (solo exhibition)

2018 – Left-handed, Pola Magnetyczne, Warsaw (solo exhibition)

2019 – Friend of a Friend, Warsaw, Pola Magnetyczne with Galerie Parisa Kind (Frankfurt am Main)

2021:

- Women Live for Love, Zachęta – National Gallery of Art, Warsaw (solo exhibition)
- Tender Attention: Urszula Czartoryska and Photography, MS2, Łódź
- Instant Archive: Instant and Instax in Poland, Gdańska Galeria Fotografii, National Museum in Gdańsk
- Self-Portrait with Blues: Hasior and New Art, Władysław Hasior Gallery, Tatra Museum, Zakopane
- My Mother, My Daughter, BWA Krosno
- With Pleasure, Fundacja SEXEDPl, Galeria Szara, Katowice, Krupa Gallery, Wrocław

2021/2022:

- Pause, Gunia Nowik Gallery (solo exhibition)
- T. G. Women Live for Love, Zachęta – National Gallery of Art, Warsaw (solo exhibition)

2022:

- Gloss, Matt, Color, The Museum of Warsaw
- Cartographies of Sublime Feelings, BWA Zielona Góra

2023:

- My Body is Your Body, Braunsfelder, Cologne
- Basel Social Club, Basel (solo exhibition)
- Multiple Realities: Experimental Art in the Eastern Bloc, 1960s–1980s, Walker Art Center, Minneapolis, Minnesota, USA (Walker Art Center, Minneapolis, 2023, Phoenix Art Museum, Arizona, 2024, Vancouver Art Gallery, British Columbia, Canada, 2025)

2024:

- Here and Now, Gunia Nowik Gallery, Warsaw (solo exhibition)
- We Want the Whole Life: Feminisms in Polish Art, State Gallery of Art, Sopot
- Art Basel Miami Beach, Miami Beach, Florida, USA (solo exhibition)

2025:

- Edward Dwurnik: Portrait from Nature, Edward Dwurnik Foundation, Warsaw
- Sophie Thun: Secret Performance, Muzeum Sztuki in Łódź
- The Children of Sławoszyno, Gunia Nowik Gallery, Warsaw (solo exhibition)
- Polish photography in Belfast Exposed Photography Gallery as part of the UK/Poland Season 2025
- Ways of Seeing, Muzeum Sztuki, Łódź
- Suddenly there was nothing, Harkawik, New York City

== Awards ==
In 2019, Gierzyńska won the 2019 Maria Anto & Elsa von Freytag-Laringhoven Art Prize.

== Bibliography ==
- Jurecki, Krzysztof, Fotografia polska lat 80-tych (Łódź: Łódzki Dom Kultury, 1989), pp. 32 and 44.
- Czartoryska, Urszula, "Niepokoje i poszukiwania," [in:] 150 lat fotografii polskiej, ed. Wiesław Prażuch (Warszawa: Wydawnictwo Arkady, 1991), pp. 25 and 26.
- Grygiel, Elżbieta, "Autoportret nie wprost," FOTO 10/1992, pp. 16–17.
- Martynowska, Ewa, "Dom artystów," Dom i Wnętrze 4/1992 pp. 48–55.
- Szabłowska, Agnieszka, Szabłowski, Tomasz, "Twórczy azyl," Polski Dom (a special edition of Dom i Wnętrzne) 1997, pp. 44–47.
- Wojciechowski, Krzysztof, Pałys, Andrzej, "T.G. ‘Istota rzeczy,’" Fototapeta 2009 (an online photography magazine).
- Masiewicz, Krzysztof, "Krótka historia pocztówki w sztuce," ArtBazaar 12/2009.
- Kuźmicz, Marika, "Kim jest Ona," [in:] O niej (Warszawa: Rempex, 2009). Exhibition catalog, p. 5.
- Jurecki, Krzysztof, "O niej czyli o kim?," Obieg 2009.
- Sokołowska, Barbara, "T.G. – ‘O niej’", Fototapeta 2009 (photographs from 1967 to 2008).
- Jurecki, Krzysztof, Oblicza fotografii (Września: Wydawnictwo "Kropka" Jolanta i Waldemar Śliwczyńscy, 2009), pp. 212, 220. ISBN 978-83-89494-25-2
