= In the Dust Cloud =

Painting by Jacek Malczewski

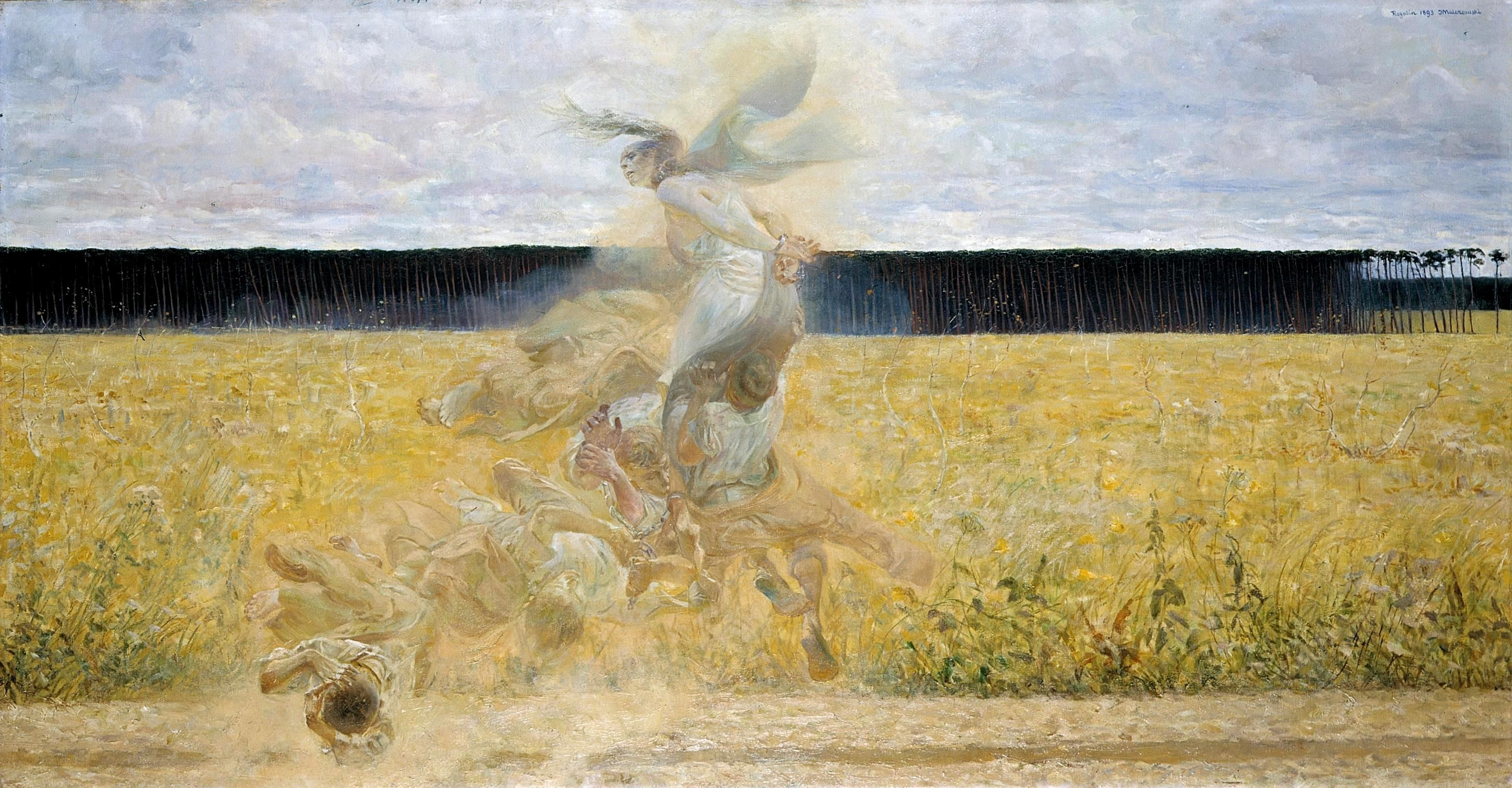
- Artist: Jacek Malczewski
- Year: 1893-1894
- Medium: Oil-on-canvas
- Dimensions: 78 cm × 150 cm (31 in × 59 in)
- Location: Raczyński Art Gallery (part of the National Museum in Poznań), Rogalin near Poznań

In the Dust Cloud, also translated as In the Dust Storm (Polish: W tumanie), is an oil-on-canvas painting by Jacek Malczewski, created in 1893-1894, during his stay in Rogalin — at the invitation of its owner, Edward Aleksander Raczyński. The work is currently part of the collection of the National Museum in Poznań and is on display in the Raczyński Art Gallery at its branch, the Rogalin Palace. The painting was created during Jacek Malczewski’s stay in Rogalin — at the invitation of its owner, Edward Aleksander Raczyński.

== Original symbolism ==
The painting (measuring 78 cm × 150 cm) depicts surreal figures hovering against the background of fallow land and pine forest in the lowland region of Greater Poland (Wielkopolska). Their symbolic meaning is interpreted in various ways: they might represent a "centrifugal force capable of breaking the shackles that bind figures enslaved by some unknown verdict," or perhaps a "deceptive 'Południca' (Lady Midday) — a dangerous demon of the summer heat in folk belief, known for causing a loss of one's senses." Alternatively, they could be a personification of "Polonia, surrounded by her offspring — some rising upward, others falling to the ground," or "helpless souls of deceased compatriots" turning toward her. According to his biographer, Adam Heydel, Malczewski conceived the idea for the painting because of a concurrent cholera epidemic, so the group of swirling apparitions may have symbolized the victims of the disease and the fear surrounding it. It has been suggested that "Malczewski's ability to evoke complex emotions and deep reflections on the human condition, its place in the world and the inexorable passage of time makes this work a crucial point in the history of Polish art and, by extension, of symbolism in Europe".

== Contemporary symbolism ==
In 2026, In the Dust Cloud became a symbol of a protest against the construction of a new road at the very site where the work was painted. Earlier that year, it was revealed that the Poznań County Roads Authority (ZDP) was well advanced in the design phase for a new road between Babki and Świątniki, Poznań County. Two of the proposed routes would cross the Rogalin Estate — an agricultural property managed by the Raczyński Foundation — which was designated as a protected Historic Monument in 2020. A third option, while bypassing this area, would destroy 14 hectares of forest, so the whole plan sparked a sharp outcry. The newly formed Association for the Care of Nature (Stowarzyszenie Troski o Przyrodę), in collaboration with the Rogalin Estate, submitted a formal request to include in the public consultation process an alternative route — one that would be significantly less expensive and far less destructive to the environment.
