= Metallurgical Worker and Metallurgical Science =

Bronze sculptures

Metallurgical Worker and Metallurgical Science are a duo set of 1903 bronze sculptures by Jean-Léon Gérôme. The pair of works were commissioned from the artist by the steel magnate Charles M. Schwab to glorify to steel industry. Schwab paid for a steel worker to travel to Paris to sit for the sculptures. The works were displayed at the industry captain's 75 room mansion on Riverside Drive New York City until its demolition in 1947. Schwab was introduced to Gérôme by Maurice Hébert, the French architect who designed his French Renaissance style home, once the largest in New York City.

The works were later gifted to the Allentown Art Museum. The monumental pieces are currently displayed outside on the recently inaugurated Allentown Arts Walk. The statues appeared at the Paris Salon of 1904 by which time the artist had died.
