= Charles Wynne Nicholls =

Irish artist (1831–1903)

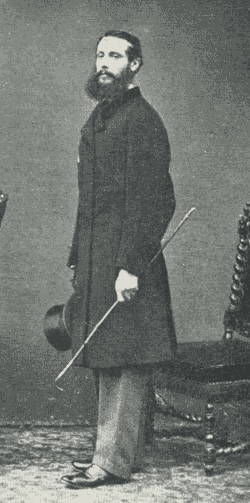
- Charles Wynne Nicholls, photograph in Dictionary of Irish Artists
- Born: 20 October 1831; Dublin, Ireland
- Died: 24 January 1903 (aged 71); London, England
- Education: Royal Dublin Society; Royal Hibernian Academy
- Known for: Painter
- Movement: Orientalist; Genre art; Victorian painting

Charles Wynne Nicholls (20 October 1831 – 24 January 1903) was an Irish painter of genre, historical subjects and Orientalist scenes. He was also a draughtsman.

== Life and career ==
Charles Wynne Nicholls was born into a middle-class family in Dublin on 20 October 1831. His father, John Nicholls, was an apothecary of 48 Dawson Street in Dublin. His mother was Martha Craven.

Nicholls studied art at the Royal Dublin Society's Schools and the Royal Hibernian Academy. He began to exhibit in 1859 as a member of the Royal Hibernian Academy. He exhibited regularly at the Royal Academy as well. He left Ireland for London in 1864, but continued to exhibit in Dublin for the rest of his life. He lived at 44 Halsey Street in London.

His genre and Oriental scenes were very popular and found a ready market among Victorian art collectors. He also produced illustrations for Pictorial Comic Life, and for an edition of Charles Dickens' Dombey and Son.

He died at his home in London on 24 January 1903.

== Work ==
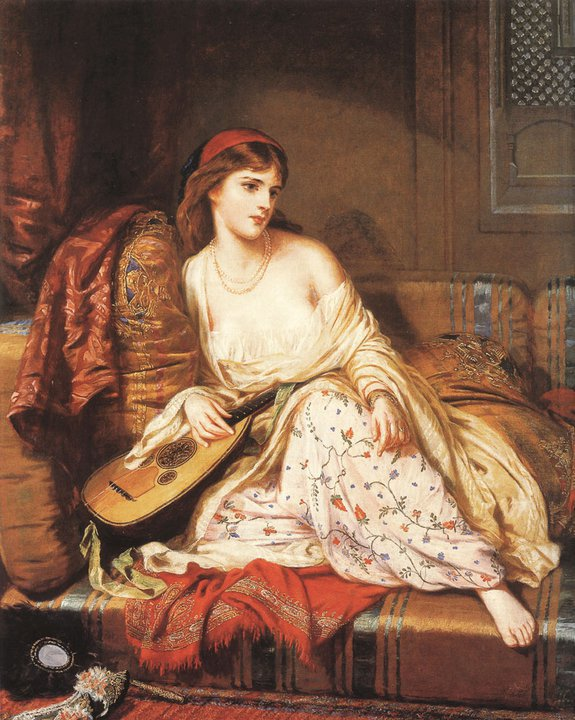
The Light of the Harem

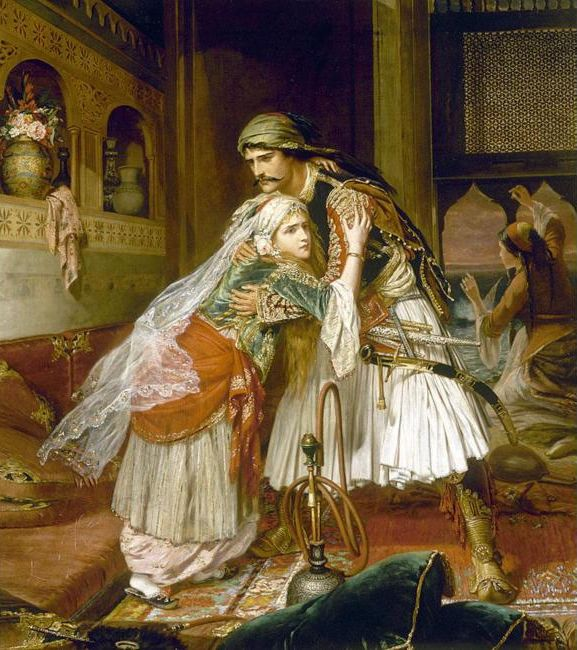
The Parting Of Conrad And Medora

Queen Victoria and Family on Brighton Sands, oil on canvas, 1860s

Select list of paintings

- Tomb of Grace Darling
- Seaside Romance
- What are the wild waves saying?
- Lady in Lilac
- The Light of the Harem
- The Race between Atlanta and Melanion
- An Eastern Beauty, 1862
- A Young Woman in Distress Attended by her Maid
- Queen Victoria and Family on Brighton Sands 1860s
- Envious Glances, 1866 Dover Collection
- Courtship on The Beach, 1867 now at Scarborough's Art Gallery
- The Parting Of Conrad And Medora
- Loves me, Loves me Not

== See also ==
- List of Orientalist artists
- Orientalism
