= Edward Dwurnik =

Polish contemporary artist (1943–2018)

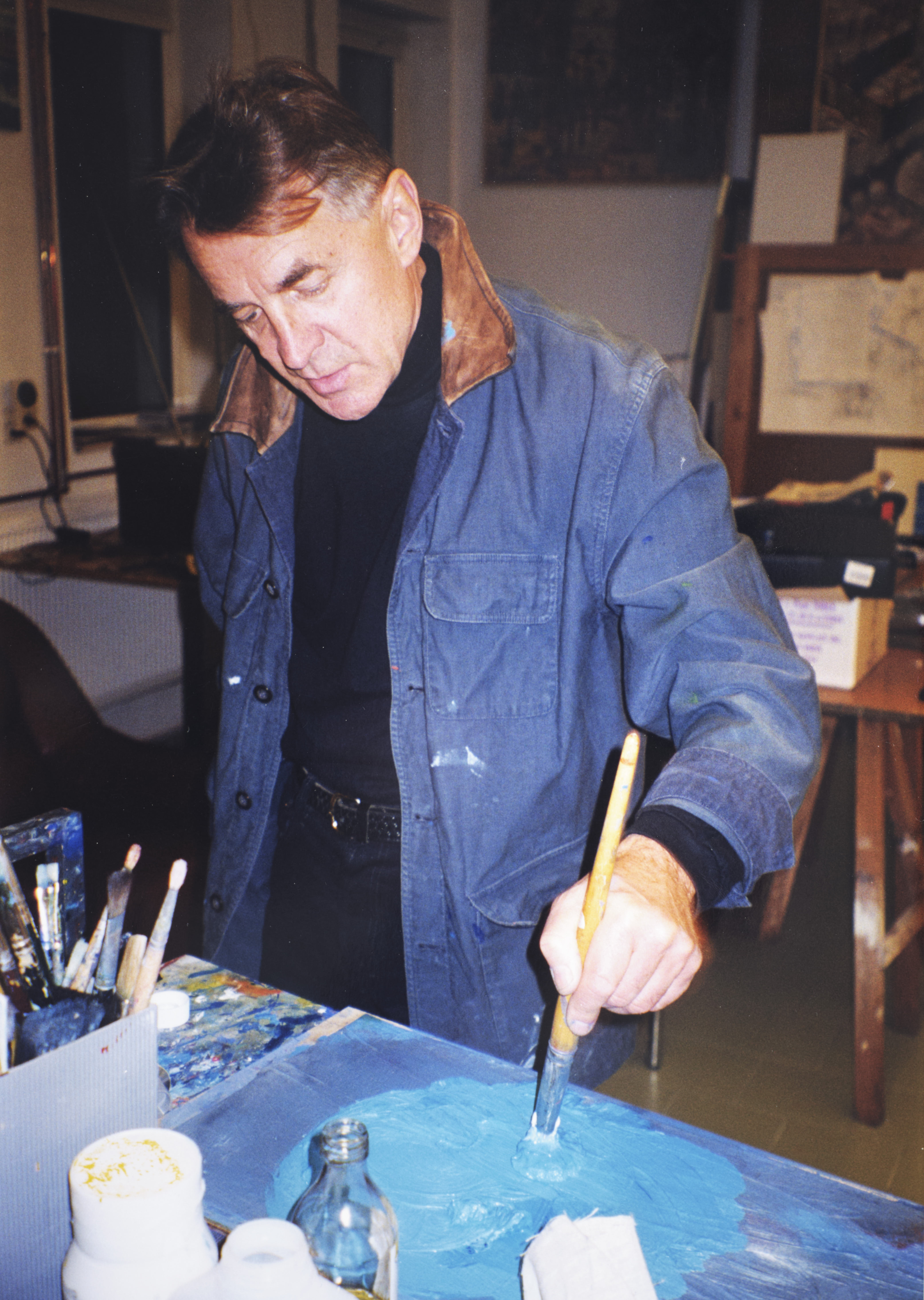
- Born: 1943-04-19; Radzymin
- Died: 2018-10-28; Warsaw
- Resting place: Avenue of the Meritorious at Powązki Military Cemetery in Warsaw
- Education: Academy of Fine Arts, Warsaw
- Known for: painting, drawing, graphics
- Notable work: "Hitchhiking trips"; "Sportsmen", "Workers",
- Spouse: Teresa Gierzyńska
- Children: 1
- Awards: Order of Polonia Restituta; Medal for Merit to Culture
- Website: https://dwurnik.pl/en/

Edward Dwurnik (born April 19, 1943 in Radzymin, d. October 28, 2018 in Warsaw) was a Polish contemporary artist. He was involved in various art forms, including painting, drawing, graphic art, and sculpture.

== Life ==
Edward Dwurnik was born on April 19, 1943, in Radzymin near Warsaw. His father, Władysław, owned a metal goods workshop, and the artist’s mother, Władysława (née Kaszuba), attended to the household duties while practicing embroidery in her free time. Apart from Edward, there were three other children in the family: Elżbieta (b. 1939), Zofia (b. 1947), and the youngest one, Józef (b. 1949).

In 1958, he began his education at State Artistic Secondary School on ulica Łazienkowska in Warsaw, which is now home to the Paderewski Museum. He was expelled from the school in 1961 for, as he himself admitted, “fighting and smoking cigarettes.” Dwurnik continued his education at a state high school in Otwock, where he passed the final exams on June 8, 1963. During that time, in addition to working at his father’s workshop, he honed his artistic skill in art classes at the Youth Culture Center, and in private painting lessons from Czesław Wdowiszewski and his wife Nina.

He began studying at the Faculty of Painting at the Academy of Fine Arts in Warsaw in 1963. Between 1966 and 1967, Dwurnik studied at the Faculty of Sculpture, where he met Teresa Gierzyńska, his future partner. In 1970, after seven years, he graduated from the painting studio of Professor Eugeniusz Eibisch. Edward Dwurnik’s diploma work consisted of a series of paintings, Dyplom (Diploma; 1969–1970), and a dissertation, “Rozumienie dzieła sztuki” (Understanding a Work of Art), which he wrote under the supervision of Professor Ksawery Piwocki.

== Work ==
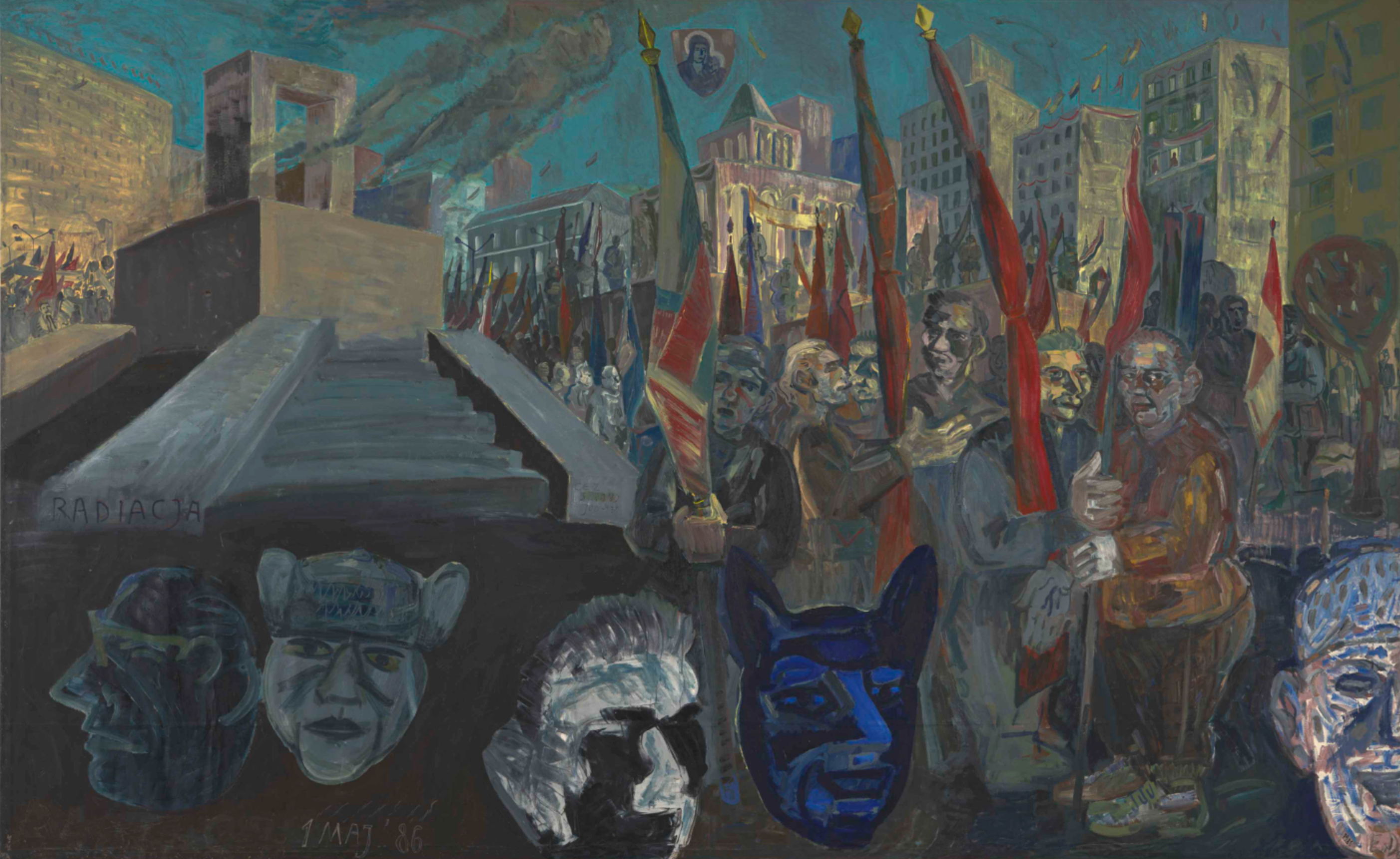
Edward Dwurnik’s painting, May 1, 1986 (Radiation), Workers series, 286 cm x 451 cm, oil on canvas, June 1986

Dwurnik’s work is divided into a complex series of paintings. Created in parallel over the years, the series often intertwine. He was a highly prolific artist who, during his long artistic career, created over 8,000 paintings on canvas and over 20,000 works on paper, each of which he meticulously described and documented in his own register.

In 1965, he first encountered the work of self-taught artist Nikifor Krynicki, whose influence shaped his own artistic style, characterized by synthetic contour drawing and narrativeness. From this moment forward, Dwurnik’s work gained new momentum, and his non-academic output began with Rysunek nr 1 (Drawing No. 1), dated June, 13 1965. In a 1996 interview, Dwurnik referred to Krynicki’s exhibition as fundamental to his artistic growth: “He was my greatest master, in fact the only one. I have never experienced greater emotions than those evoked in me by his paintings when I saw them in person.” In the same year, Dwurnik began working on the series Podróże autostopem (Hitchhiking trpis), the oldest and most extensive series in his oeuvre. According to the artist’s catalog, maintained online by the Edward Dwurnik Foundation, this series consists of over two and a half thousand works. The theme of the paintings was urban landscape, painted from a bird’s-eye view, with characteristic accumulation of motifs: people and architectural elements. Inspired by Krynicki’s painting, Dwurnik adopted and then perfected the method of rendering vedute, based on simplified drawing and the use of color patches surrounded by dark contours. Strong stylistic similarities can be noticed between his first works in the series and Nikifor’s compositions. In subsequent years, Dwurnik gradually added new components, giving the buildings a three-dimensional quality, and introduced a repertoire of motifs that did not appear in the work of the artist from Krynica. In the 1990s, he also created two unofficial subseries: Miasta diagonalne (Diagonal Cities) and Niebieskie miasta (Blue Cities). The Podróże autostopem series is numbered nine and does not include depictions of Warsaw, to whose landscapes Dwurnik devoted a separate series, numbered eleven, entitled Warszawa (Warsaw).

Edward Dwurnik’s painting Wawel, inventory no. 9216. A gift from the painter to the Wawel Royal Castle in 2010

In 1971, his first solo exhibition was held at the contemporary art gallery Galeria Współczesna in Warsaw. He presented paintings from the series: Dyplom (1969–1970), Gipsowy plener (Gypsum Exterior; 1970–1971), Droga (Way of the Cross; 1970–1971), Różne błękity (Different Blues; 1971), Namiętności (Passions; 1969). Dwurnik was already a full-fledged artist, appreciated for his “rebellious attitude” and “conclusions drawn from various trends in youth anti-art.” During his first trip abroad to Paris in 1967, he encountered the work of Bernard Buffet, which significantly influenced his expressive painting style.

In 1972, he began working on the series Sportowcy (Sportsmen), which premiered in Galeria Arkady in Krakow in 1974. Its title referred to a brand of cigarettes, Sport, commonly smoked during the communist era. Dwurnik focused on depicting ordinary people and their everyday problems, characteristic of life in the Polish People’s Republic. The series is often considered one of the most valuable works documenting everyday life in communist Poland. During almost twenty years of working on this series, Edward Dwurnik created 274 canvases.

Between 1975 and 1991, Dwurnik worked on a painting series titled Robotnicy (Workers). The 1980s were turbulent for him, and the political events in the country had a crucial impact on the themes of his paintings. The groundbreaking events of labor strikes, the birth of the “Solidarity” movement, the reality of martial law – as well as the first free election and the change of the political system – inspired Dwurnik to create a series of 260 paintings and a few hundred drawings, collages, and graphics. The canvases from the Robotnicy series are painted with dynamic brushstrokes and kept in dark tones. From 1972 to 1977, he participated in the artistic movement “O poprawę” (For Improvement).

In 1981, as a part of the Warszawa series, Edward Dwurnik included a prophetic vision of martial law, which was announced on December 13, 1981. In the winter scenery of the capital city, the artist placed crows on the snow, barbed wires, and tanks on empty streets, which constituted a clear metaphor of the upcoming events.

Despite the country’s political turmoil, the turn of the 1970s and 1980s was a time of numerous successes for Dwurnik, both professionally and personally. In 1989, his first solo exhibition abroad was presented at the Georg van Almsick Gallery in Gronau-Epe. A year later, his daughter Apolonia Dwurnik was born. At the same time, Edward Dwurnik began working on the series Krzyż (Cross; 1979–1991), which explored the iconography of crucifixion. In 1982, as the only Pole, Edward Dwurnik participated in the prestigious documenta 7 exhibition in Kassel, where he had the opportunity to meet the famous German artist, Joseph Beuys. Five years later, in 1987, the first museum exhibition of Dwurnik’s works took place in the National Museum in Wroclaw.

The early 1990s mark the politically engaged painting series, such as Droga na wschód (The Way to the East; 1989–1991), devoted to the victims of Stalin’s regime, and Od grudnia do czerwca (From December to June; 1990–1993), which was a tribute to the ninety-six people murdered during martial law, listed in a report by a special committee appointed by Contract Sejm to investigate the activities of the Ministry of Internal Affairs. Between 1991 and 1994, Dwurnik worked on the Niech żyje wojna! (Long Live the War!) series which criticized and commented on the tragic events in the former Yugoslavia. At the same time, he created canvases inspired by sea views from the series Błękitny (Blue; 1992–2018) and humorous paintings from the series Wyliczanka (Counting; 1966–1999).

Between 2000 and 2018, as part of the XXV series, Dwurnik created abstract paintings in the style of action painting, which were presented in an exhibition entitled Edward Dwurnik. Thanks Jackson in 2005 in Bunkier Sztuki Gallery of Contemporary Art in Krakow. Simultaneously, Dwurnik also created large-format paintings which entered into dialogue with the work of Jan Matejko, an example of which is Bitwa pod Grunwaldem (The Battle of Grunwald) from 2010, painted for the six hundredth anniversary of the historic victory.

Since 2019, Edward Dwurnik has been represented in the art world by the private gallery Raster in Warsaw.

== Personal life ==
In 1968, Dwurnik married photographer Teresa Gierzyńska, with whom he remained in a relationship until 2003. Together they had one child. From 1983, they lived in the Sadyba neighborhood in Warsaw, which is the current location of the Edward Dwurnik Foundation, run by the artist’s family.

== Selected solo exhibitions ==
1965 Edward Dwurnik. Malarstwo, lokal NOT, Kielce

1971 Edward Dwurnik. Obrazy i rysunki, Galeria Współczesna, Warsaw

1977 Edward Dwurnik. Wystawa malarstwa, Galeria Kordegarda, Warsaw

1978 Edward Dwurnik. Malarstwo, Centre of Art Promotion, Łódź

1985 Edward Dwurnik. Schilderijen, tekeningen en beelden, Stedelijk Van Abbemuseum, Eindhoven

1985 Edward Dwurnik. Paintings from 1980-1984, Asperger&Bischoff Gallery Inc., Chicago

1986 Edward Dwurnik. Zeichnungen, Kunstverein

1987 Edward Dwurnik, Benjamin Rhodes Gallery, London

1988 Dwurnik. Malarstwo, BWA, Olsztyn

1990 Edward Dwurnik. “Droga na Wschód”, Ujazdowski Castle Centre for Contemporary Art, Warsaw

1992 Edward Dwurnik. Niech żyje wojna!, Galeria Zderzak, Krakow

1994 Edward Dwurnik. Retrospektive, Wüttembergischer Kunstverein, Stuttgart

1997 Od Grudnia do Czerwca, Leon Wyczółkowski Regional Museum, Upper Silesian Museum in Bytom

1999 Edward Dwurnik. Malarstwo, Państwowa Galeria Sztuki in Sopot

2001 Edward Dwurnik. Malarstwo. Próba retrospektywy, Zachęta National Gallery of Art, Warsaw

2003 Edward Dwurnik. Malarstwo, Galeria Biała, Lublin

2004 Edward Dwurnik. Malarei & Zeichnungen, k9 aktuelle Kunst, Hanover

2005 Thanks Jackson, Bunkier Sztuki, Krakow

2013 Edward Dwurnik. Obłęd / Madness, National Museum in Krakow

2018 75 x 75 Dwurnik, retrospektywa, Państwowa Galeria Sztuki in Sopot

2019 Zbiórka na placu, Galeria Raster, Warsaw

2019 Edward Dwurnik (1943-2018), Mazovian Centre for Contemporary Art Elektrownia, Radom

2021 Edward Dwurnik. Polska, Znaki Czasu. Centre of Contemporary Art, Toruń

2022 Sosny, Galeria Raster, Warsaw

2025 Edward Dwurnik. Portret z natury, Edward Dwurnik Foundation, Warsaw

== Selected group exhibitions ==
1971 Warszawa w sztuce, Dom Artysty Plastyka, Warsaw

1977 Wystawa “CDN – Prezentacje sztuki młodych”, Warsaw

1979 IV International Drawing Biennale, Cleveland

1982 documenta 7, Kassel

1984 V Biennale de Paris

1985 Nouvelle Biennale de Paris, Grande Halle de la Vilette, Paris

1987 XIX Bienal Internacional de Arte Sao Paulo 1987. Polonia, São Paulo

1990 Sztuka stanu wojennego. Zima 81/82, National Museum in Wrocław

1990 Raj utracony. Sztuka Polska w roku 1949 i 1989, Ujazdowski Castle Centre for Contemporary Art, Warsaw

1994–1995 Der Riss im Rau. Positionen der Kunst seit 1945 in Deutschland, Polen, der Slowakei und Tschechien, Guardini Stiftung Berlin, Verlag der Kunst, Martin-Gropius-Bau, Berlin

1997 Art from Poland 1945-1996, Museum of Fine Arts, Budapest

1999 Generations – Polish Art of the End/Beginning of the Century,, Saint Petersburg Manege

2000 Uważaj, wychodząc z własnych snów, możesz się znaleźć w cudzych, Zachęta National Gallery of Art, Warsaw

2000 Obrazy śmierci, National Museum in Krakow

2000 Polonia Polonia, Zachęta National Gallery of Art, Warsaw

2001 Hommage à Paul Klee, National Museum in Warsaw

2003 Pochwała litografii, Galeria Test, Warsaw

2011 Tür an Tür. Polen – Deutschland. 1000 Jahre Kunst und Geschichte, Martin-Gropius-Bau, Berlin

2015 Future Present, Schaulager, Basel

2022 Walka o ulice, Museum of Modern Art in Warsaw: Museum on the Vistula

2024 Nie pytaj o Polskę, Znaki Czasu. Centre of Contemporary Art, Toruń

== Works in collections ==
Edward Dwurnik’s works are located in numerous public and private collections in Poland and abroad, including the Albertina Museum Vienna, the Museum Ludwig in Cologne, the Van Abbemuseum in Eindhoven, the Museum of Modern Art in New York, as well as the Museum of Modern Art in Warsaw, the Zachęta National Gallery of Art, and national museums in Warsaw, Krakow, Gdańsk, Poznań, Wrocław, Łódź, Olsztyn, and Szczecin. Dwurnik’s works are also present in institutional collections, including the ING Polish Art Foundation and PKO Bank Polski.

== Death ==
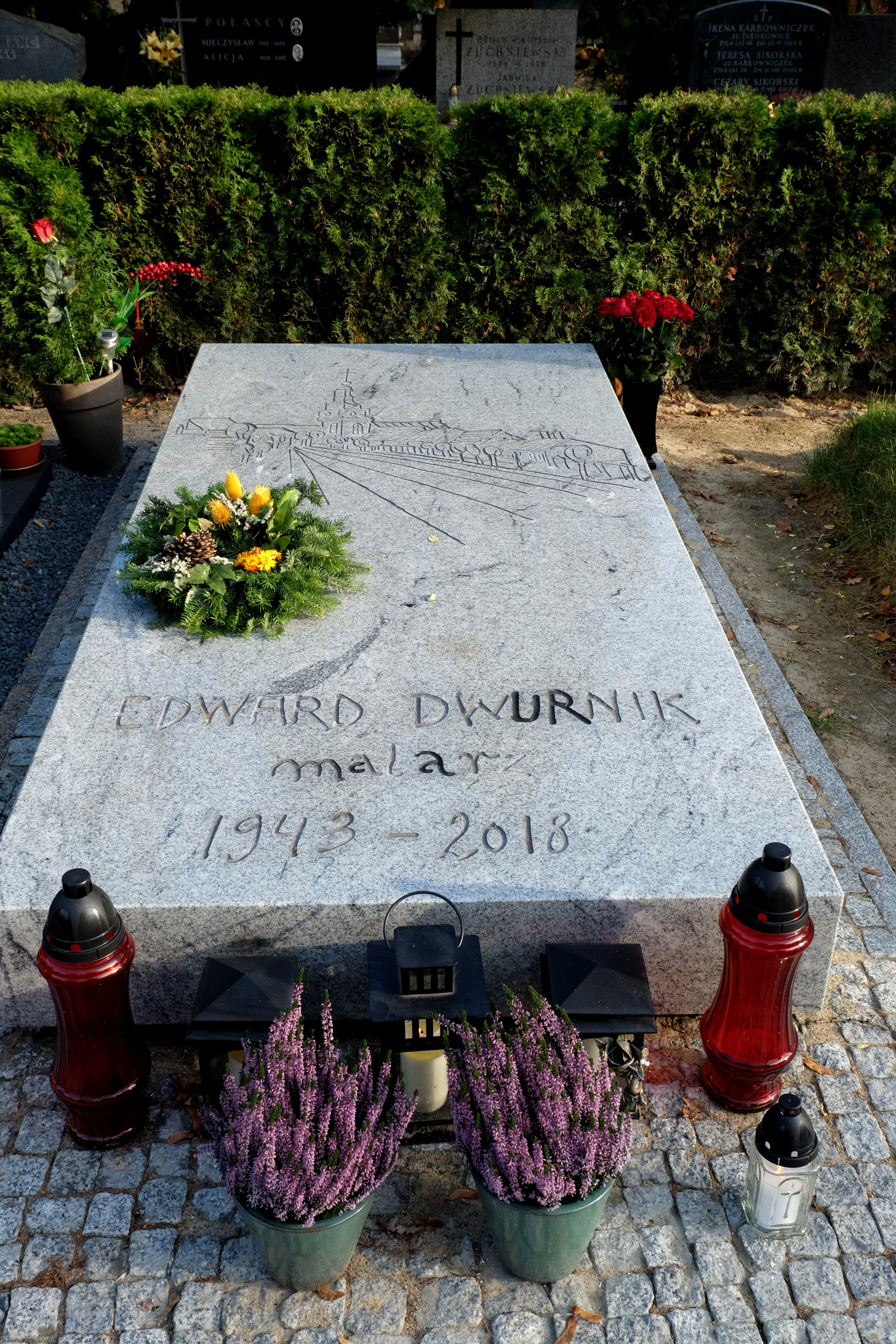
Edward Dwurnik’s grave at Powązki Military Cemetery in Warsaw.

Edward Dwurnik died at his home in Warsaw’s Sadyba on October 28, 2018, as a result of lung cancer. The funeral took place on November 5, 2018. The painter was buried in the Avenue of the Meritorious at Powązki Military Cemetery in Warsaw.

== Distinctions ==
- “Solidarity” Cultural Award (1983)
- The Order of Polonia Restituta (2014)
- The Gold Gloria Artis Medal for Merit to Culture (2015)
