= Aleksander Wielopolski =

Chief of the Civil Government of Congress Kingdom of Poland from 1862 to 1863

Margrave Aleksander Wielopolski
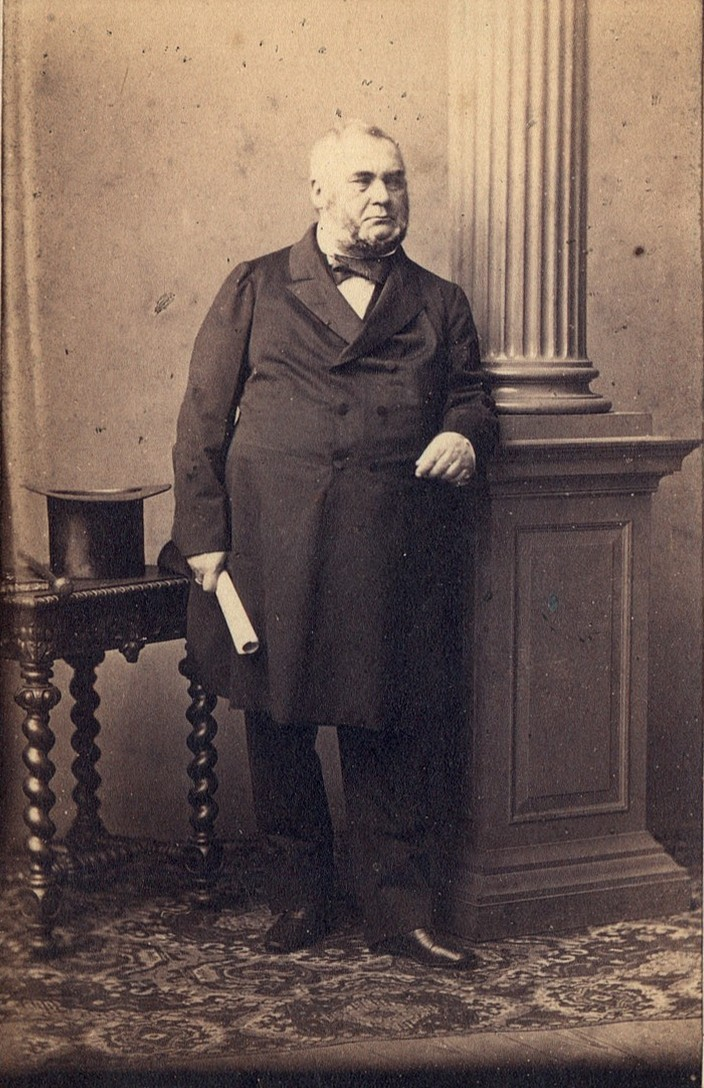

Chief of the Civil Government
- In office June 1862 – July 1863
- Monarch: Alexander II
- Preceded by: Office established
- Succeeded by: Office abolished

Personal details
- Born: 13 March 1803 Sędziejowice, West Galicia, Habsburg monarchy
- Died: 30 December 1877 (aged 74) Dresden, Kingdom of Saxony, German Empire
- Spouse(s): Teresa Potocka; Paulina Apolonia Potocka
- Children: Zygmunt Wielopolski; Józef Wielopolski; Władysław Wielopolski
- Parent(s): Józef Stanisław Wielopolski; Eleonora Dembińska
- Awards: Grand Cross of the Order of Franz Josef
- Noble family: Wielopolski

Margrave (Polish: margrabia) Aleksander Ignacy Jan-Kanty Wielopolski (1803–1877) was a Polish aristocrat from the Wielopolski family, owner of large estates, and the 13th lord of the manor of Pinczów. In 1862 he was appointed Chief of Poland's Civil Government within the Russian Empire under Tsar Alexander II.

== Early life, education and early career ==
Wielopolski was born on 13 March 1803 in Sędziejowice which at the time was part of the Habsburg monarchy.

Wielopolski was educated in Vienna, Warsaw, Paris and Göttingen. In 1830 he was elected a member of the Polish diet on the Conservative side. At the beginning of the November Uprising of 1831 he was sent to London alongside Alexandre Colonna-Walewski (son of Napoleon I) to obtain the assistance, or at least the mediation, of England, but the only result of his mission was the publication of the pamphlet Mémoire présenté à Lord Palmerston (Warsaw, 1831). On the collapse of the insurrection he emigrated, and on his return to Poland devoted himself exclusively to literature and the cultivation of his estates.

After the fall of the uprising, he collaborated with "Kwartalnik Naukowy" magazine which was published in Kraków by Antoni Zygmunt Helcel. He also worked with Paweł Popiel. Wielopolski working together with them influenced the ideological concepts of the emerging conservative party of Kraków.

On the occasion of the Galician outbreak of 1846, when the Galician peasantry massacred some hundreds of Polish landowners, an outbreak generally attributed to the machinations of the Austrian government, Wielopolski wrote his Lettre d'un gentilhomme polonais au prince de Metternich (Brussels, 1846), which caused a great sensation at the time, and in which he attempted to prove that the Austrian court was acting in collusion with the Russians in the affair.

== National politics ==
In 1861, Wielopolski was appointed president of the commissions of public worship and justice and subsequently president of the council of state. A visit to the Russian capital in November still further established his influence, and in 1862 he was appointed adjutant to Grand Duke Konstantin, who had recently been appointed Polish viceroy. Being adjutant to the Polish viceroy granted him the post of Chief of the Civil Government.

Wielopolski was conservative, pro-Russian, a proponent of regaining Poland's pre-1830 autonomy, and a champion of the emancipation of Jews. He undertook educational reforms, increasing the number of Polish-language schools and establishing in Warsaw the "Main School" (Szkoła Główna, today's University of Warsaw, the Royal University of Warsaw.

He also enacted reforms of the banking system, and a form of conservative land reform (towards greater degree of land tenancy rather than serfdom).

He felt that the Russian Empire's difficult internal and international situation would force the Tsarist administration to make certain concessions to the Polish nobility. On the other hand, the Polish nobility should – in his opinion – accept Tsarist rule and take part in the Empire's political life instead of calling for independence.

Initially the motivation of his project was connected to the period around 1815 when Tsare Alexander I signed the Constitution of the Kingdom of Poland, and even made promises to extend liberties to the parts of the Polish-Lithuanian Commonwealth directly incorporated into Russia (the "Taken Lands" Ziemie zabrane). Ultimately, Wielopolski gave up such ideas and proposed instead: formal condemnation of the November Uprising and acceptance of the Romanov dynasty's everlasting rule over Poland, expecting in turn from the Tsar the restoration of Polish liberties, a semi-independent government, curtailment of censorship, and the closure of Russian Military Courts. His proposal, unfortunately, was rejected, and the Tsar decided to make various limited concessions only when it was too late, and the streets of Warsaw were running with blood: "No constitution, no Polish Army, nothing like political autonomy; instead administrative freedoms with nominations for Poles, not excluding Russians".

Wielopolski knew that the Poles' fervent desire for independence was coming to a head, something he wanted to avoid at all costs. He initially carried out arrests and closed civic organizations in Warsaw. In a final attempt to derail the Polish national movement, he organized the conscription of young Polish activists into the Russian Army (for 20-year service). That decision is what provoked the January Uprising of 1863, that is, the very outcome Wielopolski wished to avoid.

During the fiercest days of the Uprising Wielopolski asked for a 2-month leave of office. This was granted by the Russian Royal Prince in early July 1863, and on 16 July he left Warsaw heading north. Officially he traveled to the spa on the island of Rügen, but in fact he chose emigration, and left the country forever. He settled in Dresden (Saxony).

== Awards and honours ==
In 1870 Wielopolski was granted the Grand Cross of the Order of Franz Joseph by Emperor Franz Joseph I.

== Death ==
He died 14 years later, on 30 December 1877 in Dresden, Kingdom of Saxony, German Empire. His body was, however, brought to his native Poland. He is buried in the crypt of the Holy Spirit church at Młodzawy Małe.

== Popular culture ==
In 1903 artist Jacek Malczewski painted Polish Hamlet: Portrait of Aleksander Wielopolski. This painting is often confused as a portrait of Aleksander Wielopolski the Chief of the Civil Government of the Congress Kingdom of Poland though it is depicting his grandson who has the same name as him.

Przemysław Gintrowski created a song based on his attitude and character based on the poem titled 'Magrabia Wielopolski' by Jerzy Czech.
