= Andrei Bantikov =

Russian painter

Andrei Sergeevich Bantikov
- Born: 23 October 1914; Moscow Governorate, Russian Empire
- Died: 11 December 2001 (aged 87); Saint Petersburg, Russia
- Education: Repin Institute of Arts
- Known for: Painting
- Movement: Realism
- Awards: Order of the Red Star; Medal "For the Defence of Leningrad"; Medal "For the Victory Over Germany"

Andrei Sergeevich Bantikov (Russian: Бантиков Андрей Сергеевич; 23 October 1914, Moscow Governorate, Russian Empire – 11 December 2001, Saint Petersburg) was a Russian and Soviet painter, a member of the Leningrad Union of Soviet Artists, who lived and worked in Saint Petersburg (former Leningrad), regarded as one of representatives of the Leningrad School of Painting.

Participated in exhibitions since 1939. Member of the society of the Grekov Studio of War Artists in 1952-1962. He painted a lot on the sea theme. He taught: "Leningrad Higher Artistic Industrial School" 1948-51.

== See also ==
- Leningrad School of Painting
- House of creativity «Staraya Ladoga»
- List of Russian artists
- List of 20th-century Russian painters
- List of painters of Saint Petersburg Union of Artists
- Saint Petersburg Union of Artists

== Sources ==
- 1917 — 1957. Выставка произведений ленинградских художников. Каталог. — Л: Ленинградский художник, 1958. — с.8.
- Ленинград. Зональная выставка 1964 года. Каталог. — Л: Художник РСФСР, 1965. — с.10.
- Изобразительное искусство Ленинграда. Каталог выставки. — Л: Художник РСФСР, 1976. — с.14.
- Выставка произведений художников - ветеранов Великой Отечественной войны. - Л: ЛОСХ РСФСР, 1978. - 3.
- Directory of Members of the Union of Artists of USSR. Vol. 1. - Moscow: Soviet artist, 1979. P.91.
- Зональная выставка произведений ленинградских художников 1980 года. Каталог. — Л: Художник РСФСР, 1983. — с.9.
- Выставка произведений художников - ветеранов Великой Отечественной войны. - Л: ЛОСХ РСФСР, 1987. - с.3.
- Directory of members of the Leningrad branch of Union of Artists of Russian Federation. - Leningrad: Khudozhnik RSFSR, 1987. P.10.
- Государственный Русский музей. Живопись. Первая половина ХХ века. Каталог. А—В. СПб, Palace Editions. 1997. С. 41.
- Выставка произведений художников — ветеранов Великой Отечественной войны. СПб, 1998.
- Matthew Cullerne Bown. A Dictionary of Twentieth Century Russian And Soviet Painters. 1900 — 1980s. — London: Izomar Limited, 1998.
- Выставка, посвященная 55-летию победы в Великой Отечественной войне. СПб, 2000. С. 3.
- Мы помним… Художники, искусствоведы – участники Великой Отечественной войны. – М: Союз художников России, 2000. – с.34-35.
- Художники - городу. Выставка к 70-летию Санкт-Петербургского Союза художников. Каталог. - Санкт-Петербург: Петрополь, 2003. - с.178.
- Sergei V. Ivanov. Unknown Socialist Realism. The Leningrad School. Saint Petersburg, NP-Print Edition, 2007. P.18, 385-387, 392. ISBN 5-901724-21-6, ISBN 978-5-901724-21-7.
- Юбилейный Справочник выпускников Санкт-Петербургского академического института живописи, скульптуры и архитектуры имени И. Е. Репина Российской Академии художеств. 1915—2005. — Санкт Петербург: «Первоцвет», 2007. — с.52.
