= Polish Hamlet. Portrait of Aleksander Wielopolski =

1903 painting by Jacek Malczewski

- Hamlet polski. Portret Aleksandra Wielopolskiego (Polish)
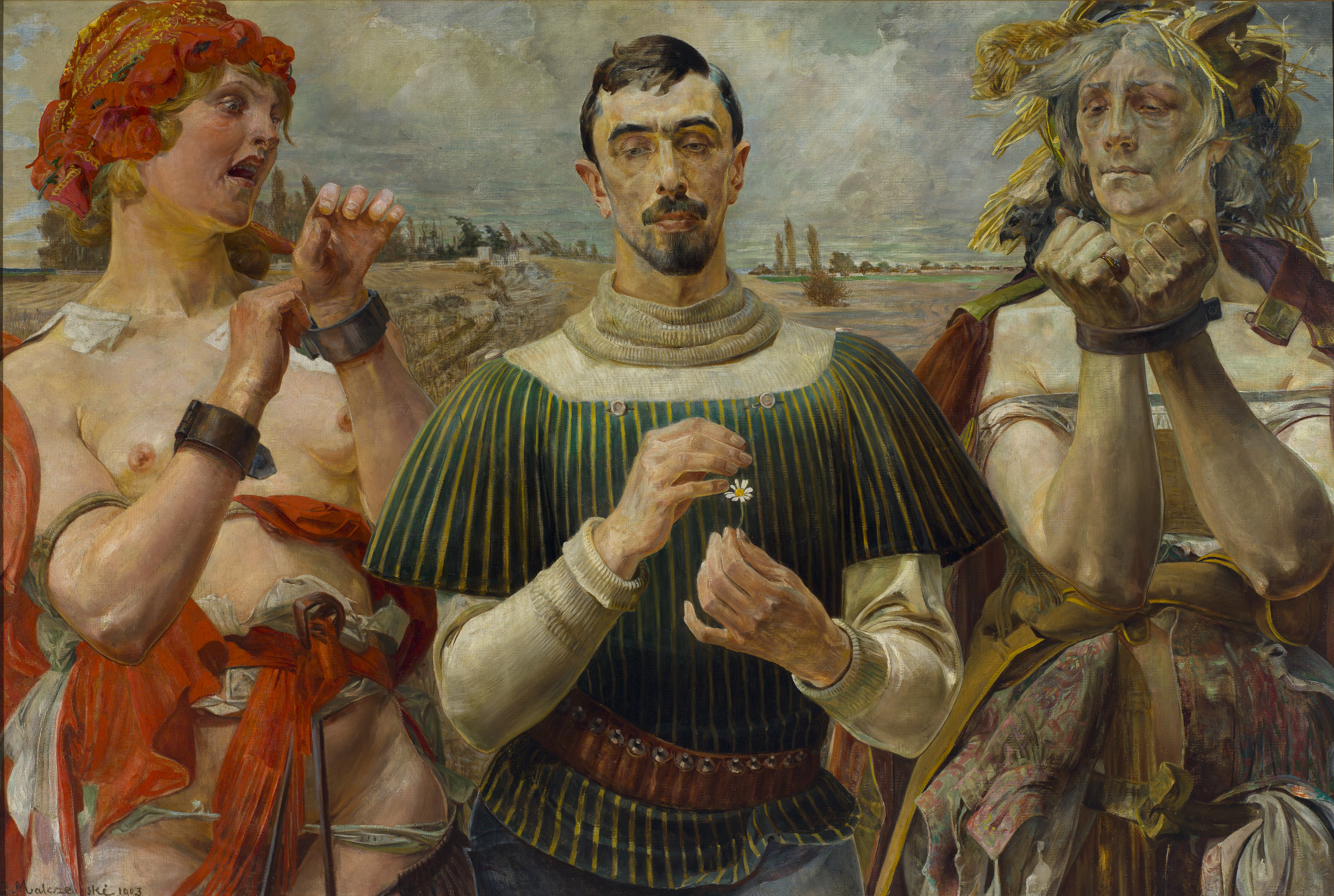
- Artist: Jacek Malczewski
- Year: 1903
- Medium: oil on canvas
- Dimensions: 100 cm × 148 cm (39 in × 58 in)
- Location: National Museum, Warsaw

Polish Hamlet. Portrait of Alexander Wielopolski is an oil painting by Jacek Malczewski from 1903, presenting the allegorical grandson Aleksander Wielopolski and two different visions of the fate of the Polish nation. It is in the collection of the National Museum, Warsaw.

== Description ==
It was painted in 1903, and is one of the most famous works of Malczewski. It presents the grandson of Aleksander Wielopolski – Polish politician, a member of the Polish Kingdom government in the early 1860s, who tried to maneuver between the interests of the invaders and the Polish population – in the act of considering his grandfather's legacy. The figure is located in the center of the composition, between two women. He is dressed in yellow-green dress and belted pouch, in which instead of bullets are tubes of paint, and he thoughtfully pulls on the petals of chamomile.

== Analysis ==
The painting is symbolic and patriotic, it can be read in several ways. The women placed on both sides of the picture are an allegory of two different visions of the fate of their homeland. Located to the right is an elderly woman with white hair, dressed in dark robes, her hands cuffed by shackles, and her face takes on an expression of sadness, despair and awareness of their situation. She embodies Poland enslaved, experienced by fate, remaining under the yoke of others, and who can not be liberated. On the left side there is a young girl, half-naked, shown at the time of breaking the shackles. She is full of energy, and her face is very expressive. It symbolizes the "young Poland" - capable of action and being able to release from the long-term captivity.

The image can be interpreted as a question of choosing the right way and the future fate of the homeland, entering a new century. This dilemma clearly refers to the title character of Hamlet, William Shakespeare's drama and his life choice, as highlighted in the title of the work. Aleksander Wielopolski is an example of the person making the difficult decision, and carrying the consequences of that choice, resulting from the need to accept or reject the attitude towards life of his grandfather. The artist does not favor either solution. The figure of a man is pensive, lost in melancholy, and his indecision is highlighted even more by the flower in his hand and a belt on the body. The work is an expression of his concern for the future of the Polish nation.

== Mistaken identity ==
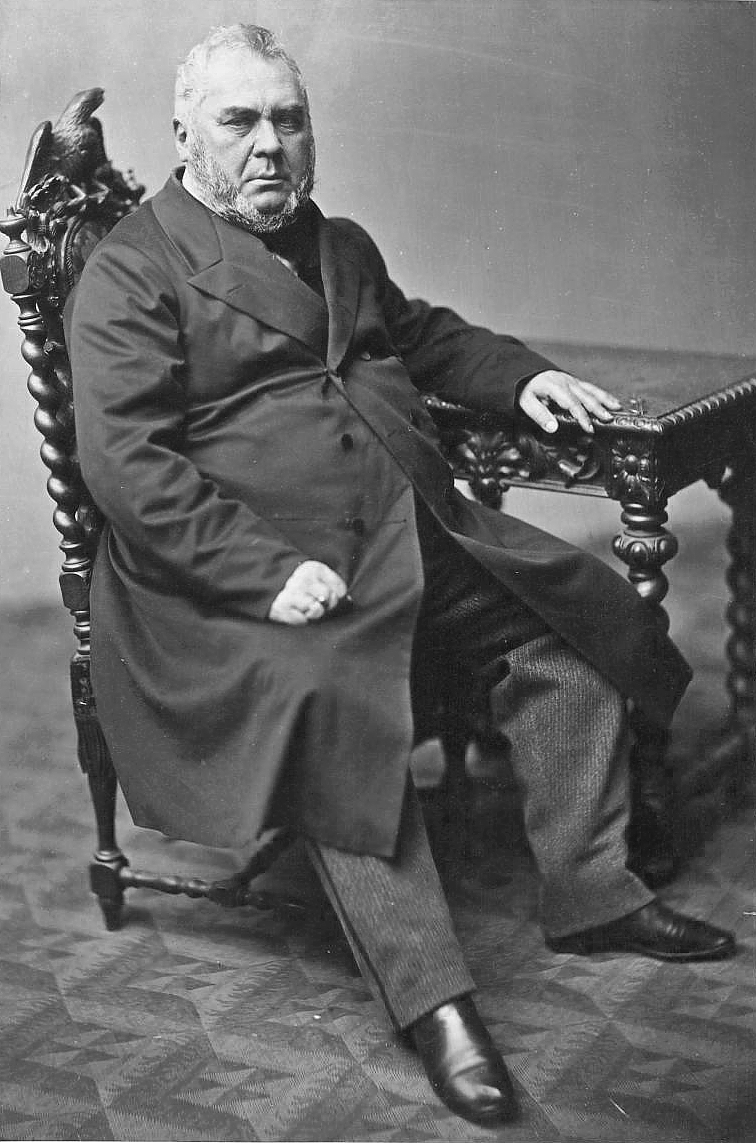
Aleksander Wielopolski (grandfather). Photography by Karol Bayer, 1862

In the literature, due to the fact that the name of portrayed Aleksander Wielopolski (grandson) was the same as his grandfather's, there is often the wrong suggestion that the image presented his grandfather. In fact, Jacek Malczewski could not portray his grandfather, because he died in 1877 and the picture was painted in 1903. In addition, the portrayed person does not resemble Alexander Wielopolski.
