= Siege of Asola =

Siege of Asola may refer to:

- Siege of Asola (1483), during the War of Ferrara
- Siege of Asola (1516), during the War of the League of Cambrai
- The Siege of Asola, painting by Tintoretto
