= National Museum in Poznań =

Coordinates: 52°24′31″N 16°55′44″E

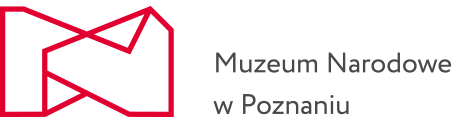

- Historic south wing, built in 1904, seen in 2026
- Established: 1857
- Location: 9 Karol Marcinkowski Avenues; Poznań, Poland
- Type: National museum
- Director: Tomasz Łęcki
- Website: www.mnp.art.pl

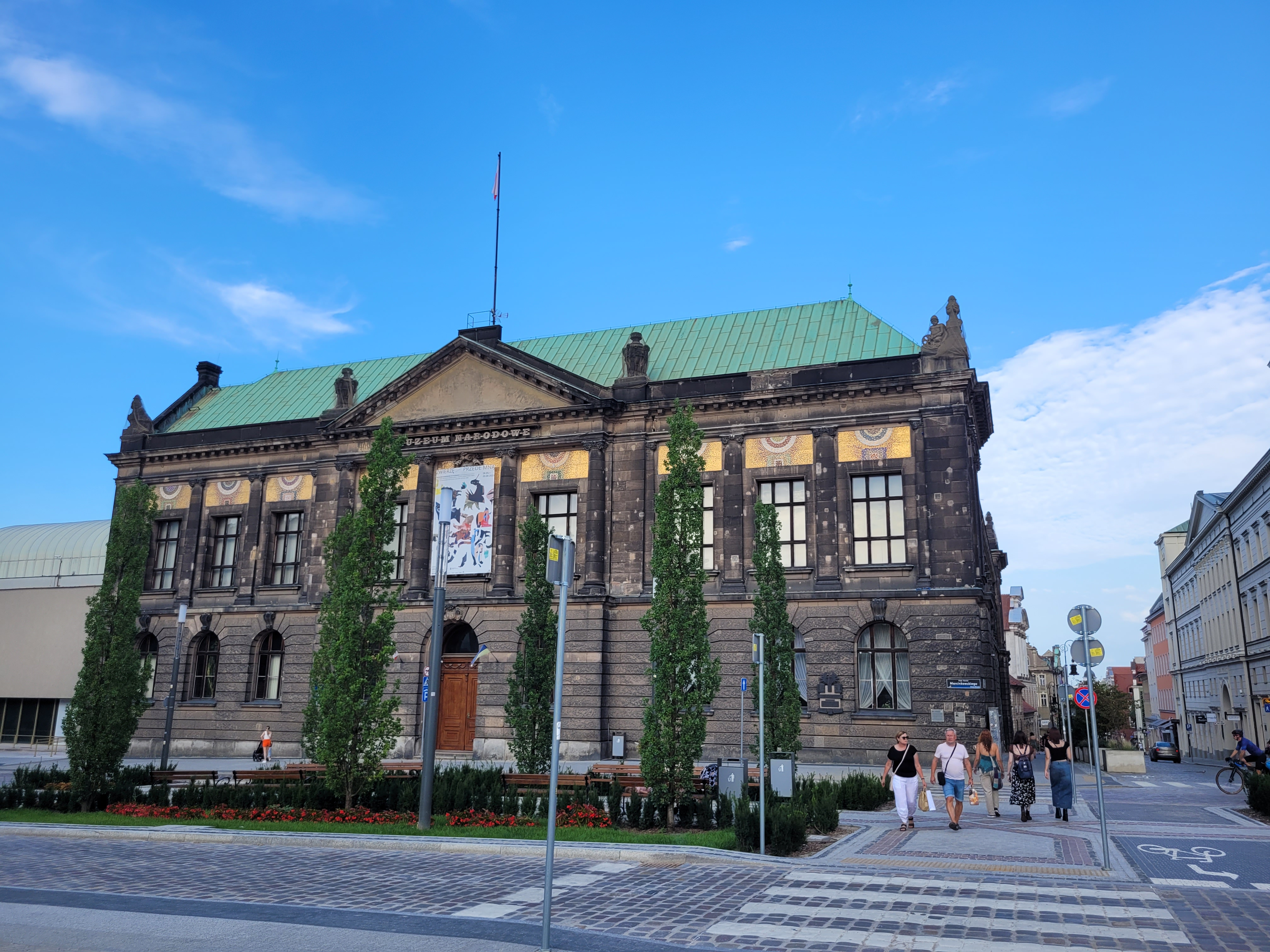
Main building of the museum

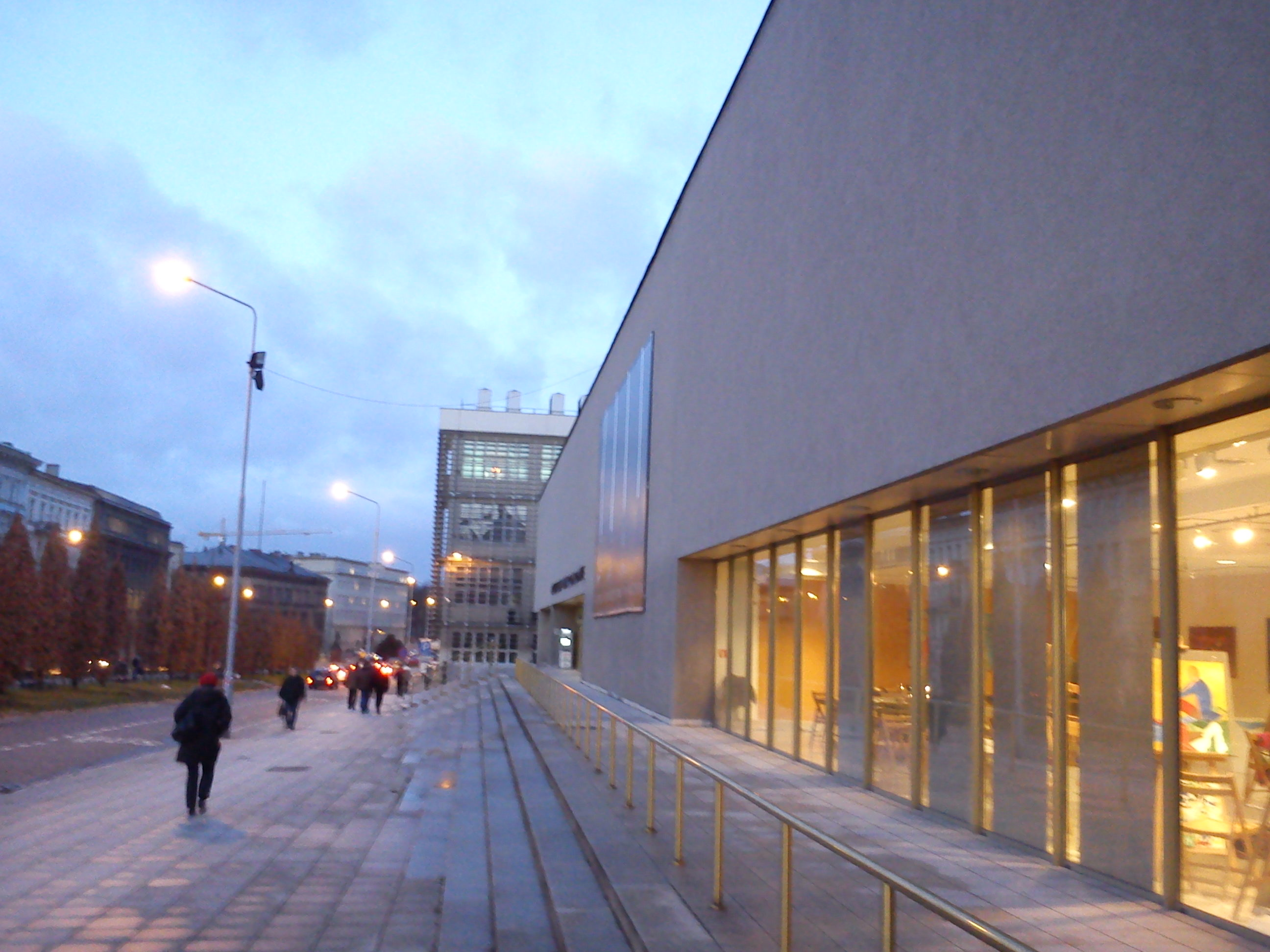
The new north wing, Gallery of Contemporary Art

The National Museum in Poznań (Polish: Muzeum Narodowe w Poznaniu), Poland, abbreviated MNP, is a state-owned cultural institution and one of the largest museums in Poland. It houses a rich collection of Polish painting from the 16th century on, and a collection of foreign painting (Italian, Spanish, Dutch and German). The museum is also home to numismatic collections and a gallery of applied arts.

== History ==
The National Museum in Poznań was established in 1857, as the "Museum of Polish and Slavic Antiquities". In 1894 the museum was renamed Provincial Museum of Posen. In 1902, the museum was renamed Kaiser-Friedrich-Museum. The current building was designed by Carl Hinckeldyen and built in 1904.

During World War II the building was damaged, the collection looted by German military, while numerous museum exhibits, including the natural and ethnographic collections, were destroyed. After the war the Polish Government retrieved many of the works taken by the Germans. At the turn of the 1960s and the 1970s the project of a new north wing of the museum was designed by architect Marian Trzaska. In the 1990s it was adapted by interior designer Witold Gyurkovich and opened to the public in 2001.

== Branches ==
- National Museum in Poznań and its branches:
  - National Museum, main building
  - Museum of Applied Arts in the Royal Castle in Poznań
  - Town Hall – Museum of Poznań
  - Military Museum of Wielkopolska
  - Museum of Musical Instruments
  - Museum of World Cultures
  - Rogalin Palace Museum
  - Gołuchów Castle
  - Adam Mickiewicz Museum in Śmiełów

== Collections ==
Museum's collections are on display in seven thematic exhibition galleries that explore the major trends and disciplines of the age: the Gallery of Antiquity, the Middle Ages, Polish Art from the 16th to 18th century, and, in the new wing, the Gallery of Polish art from the period of foreign partitions until the end of World War II, the Gallery of European Art (or Foreign Painting), the Gallery of Modern Art, and the Poster and Graphic design Gallery. In 2006, the collections of the museum included 309 569 art objects in total as well as 4119 deposits.

The works of many prominent Polish artists are displayed in the Gallery of Polish Art, which includes paintings by Jan Matejko, Olga Boznańska, Jacek Malczewski, Stanisław Wyspiański, Leon Wyczółkowski, and Władysław Czachórski.

=== Gallery of Foreign Painting ===
The main building features one of the largest galleries of foreign painting in Poland, predominantly originating from the collection owned by Count Raczyński:

- Sofonisba Anguissola, The Chess Game,
- Francesco Bassano, Vulcan's Forge,
- Giovanni Bellini, Madonna with Child,
- Bernardo Bellotto, Election of Stanislas Augustus,
- Paulus Bor, Bacchus,
- Agnolo Bronzino, Portrait of Cosimo I dei Medici in Armour,
- Robert Campin, Crucifixion,
- Juan Carreño de Miranda, The Assumption,
- Joos van Cleve, The Holy Family,
- Alonso Sánchez Coello, The Royal Feast,
- Lucas Cranach the Elder, Hercules and Omphale,
- Paul Delaroche, Pilgrims in Rome
- Circle of Anthony van Dyck, Christ Supported by Angels,
- Jan van Goyen, Fishing Port,
- Jan van Kessel, el Mozo, Dwarfs with a Dog,
- Hans Makart, Faun Playing Syrinx,
- Quentin Massys, Madonna and Child with the Lamb,
- Claude Monet, Beach in Pourville,
- Johann Friedrich Overbeck, The Marriage,
- Francesco Raibolini, Madonna and Child with St. Francis,
- Jacob Ruysdael, Fishing,
- Salomon van Ruysdael, A Catch of Fish on the Rhine at Arnhem,
- Daniel Seghers, Holy Family in a Wreath of Flowers,
- Frans Snyders, Wild Boar Hunt,
- Bernardo Strozzi, The Abduction of Europa,
- David Teniers the Younger, Operation,
- Tintoretto, The Siege of Asola (on loan from The Johnson Collection, 2002–2014),
- Palma Vecchio, Sacra Conversazione,
- Diego Velázquez, Blind Woman,
- Francisco de Zurbarán, The Virgin of the Rosary Venerated by Carthusians.

== Gallery ==
Collection highlights

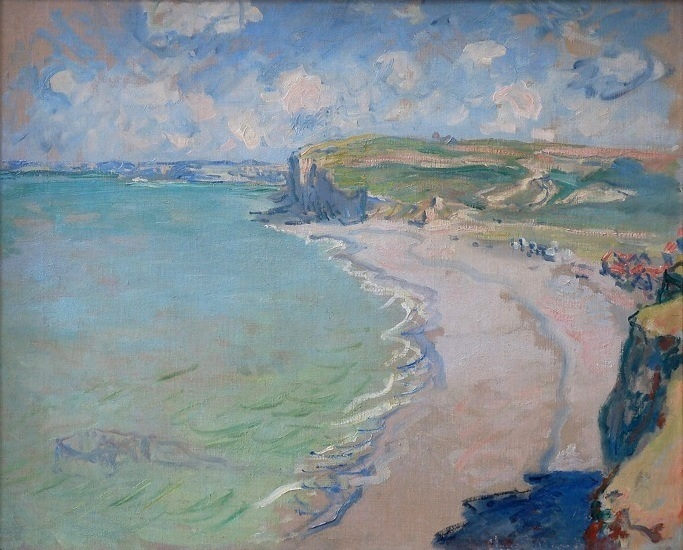
Beach in Pourville, Claude Monet, 1882

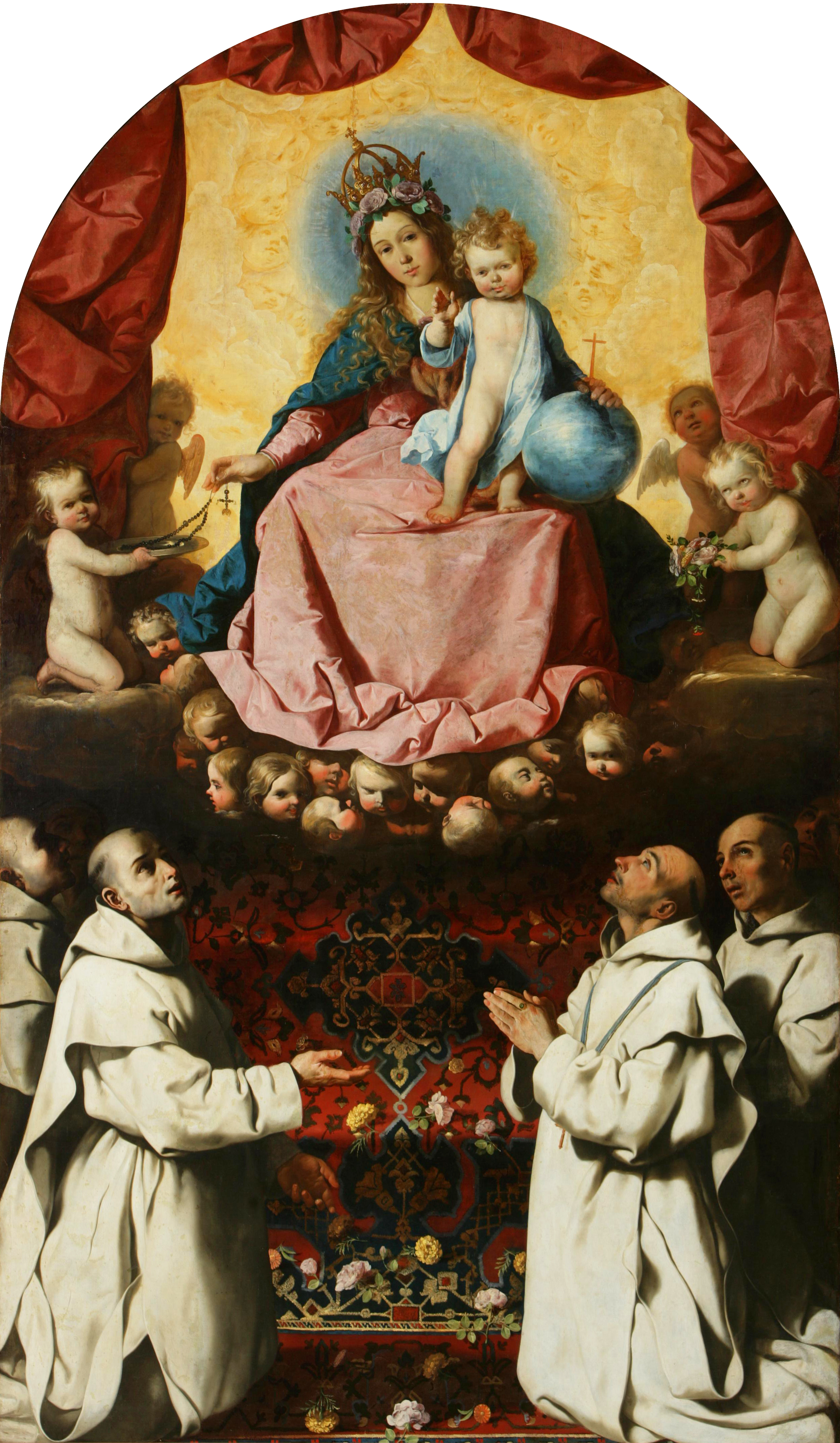
Virgin of the Rosary Venerated by Carthusians, Francisco de Zurbarán, circa 1637–1639

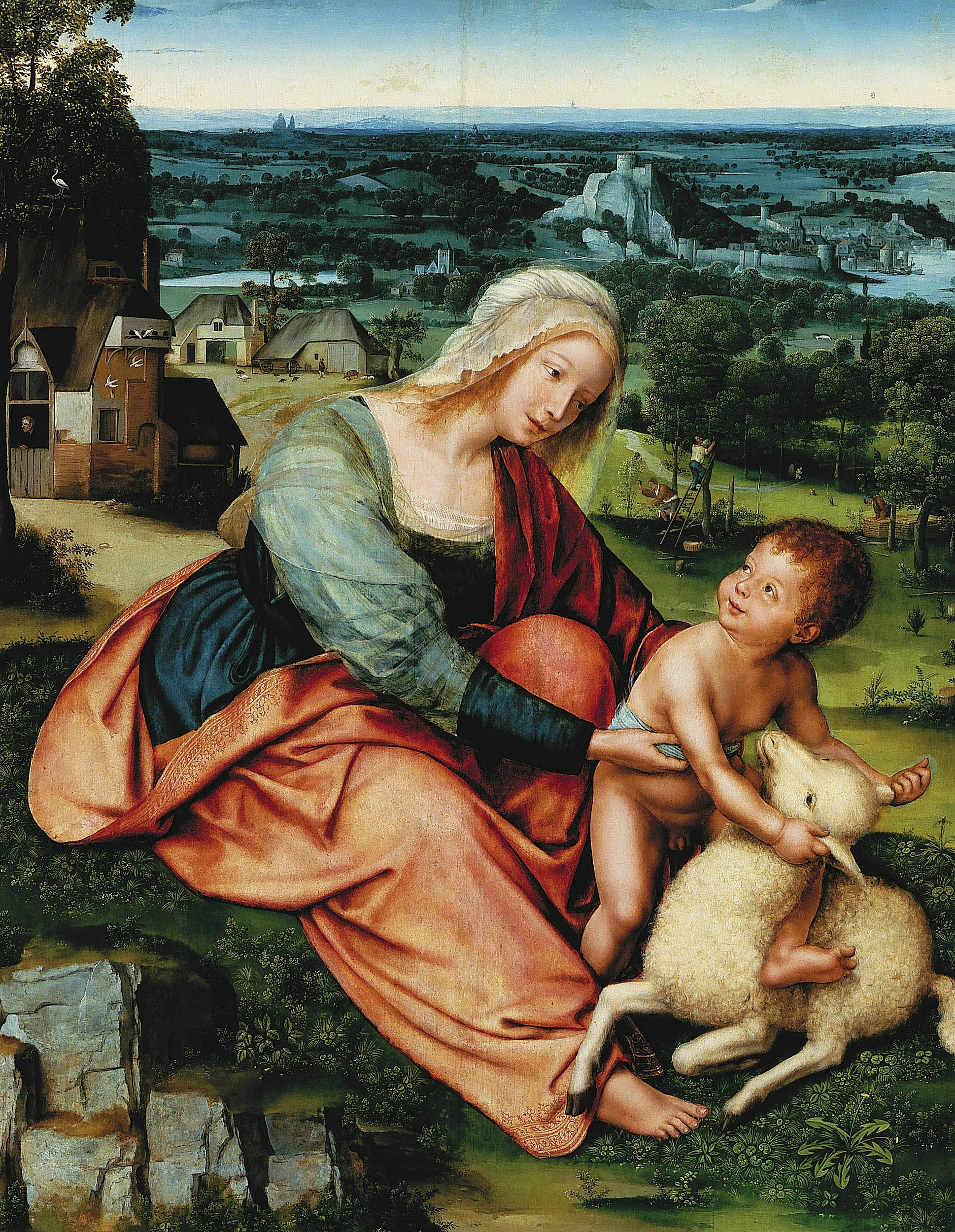
Massys Madonna and Child with the Lamb, Quentin Massys, ca. 1513

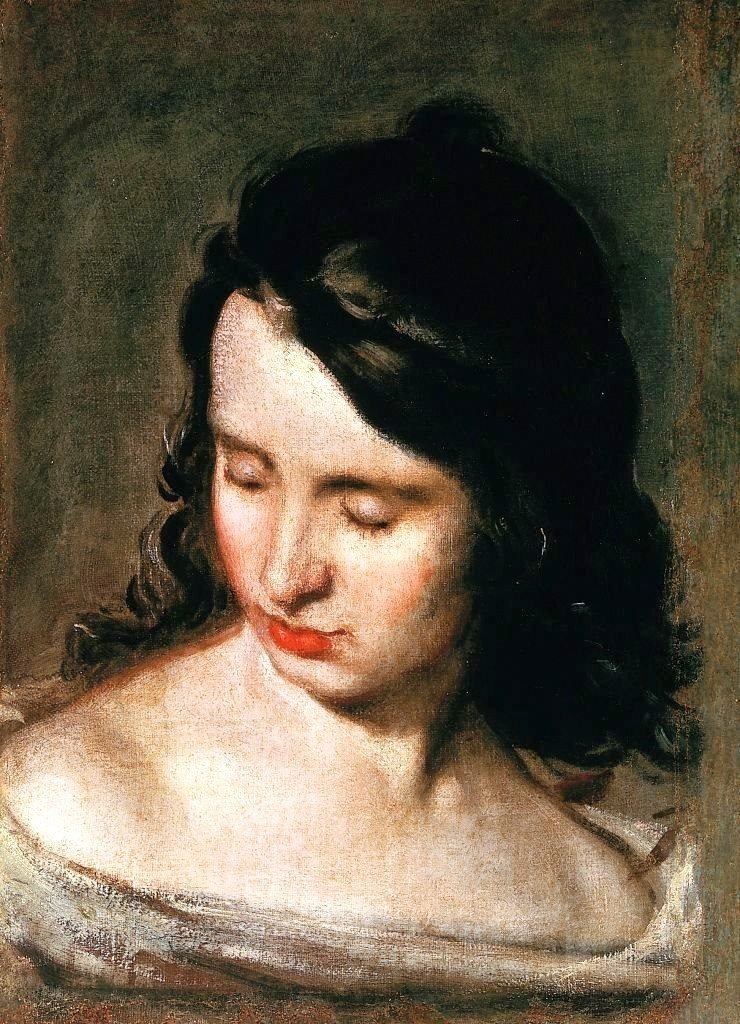
Blind Woman, Diego Velázquez, 1650s

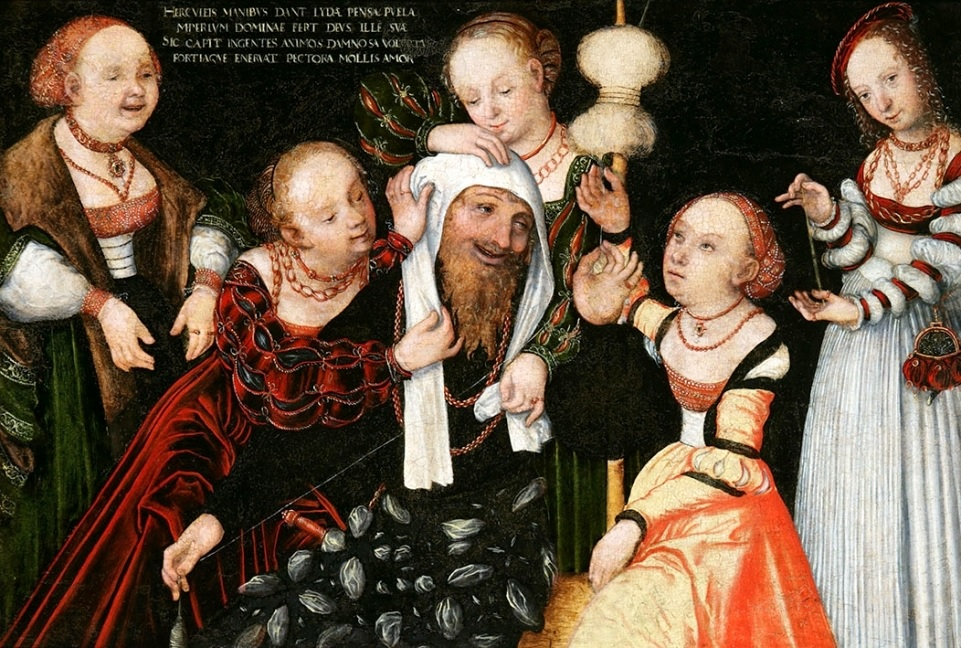
Hercules and Omphale, Lucas Cranach the Elder, 1537

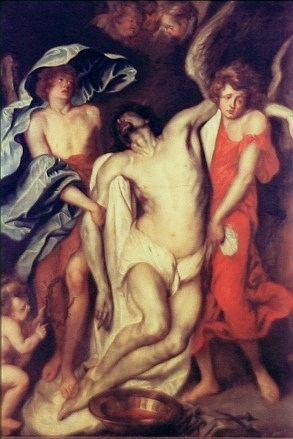
Christ Supported by Angels, Circle of Anthony van Dyck, 1640–1650

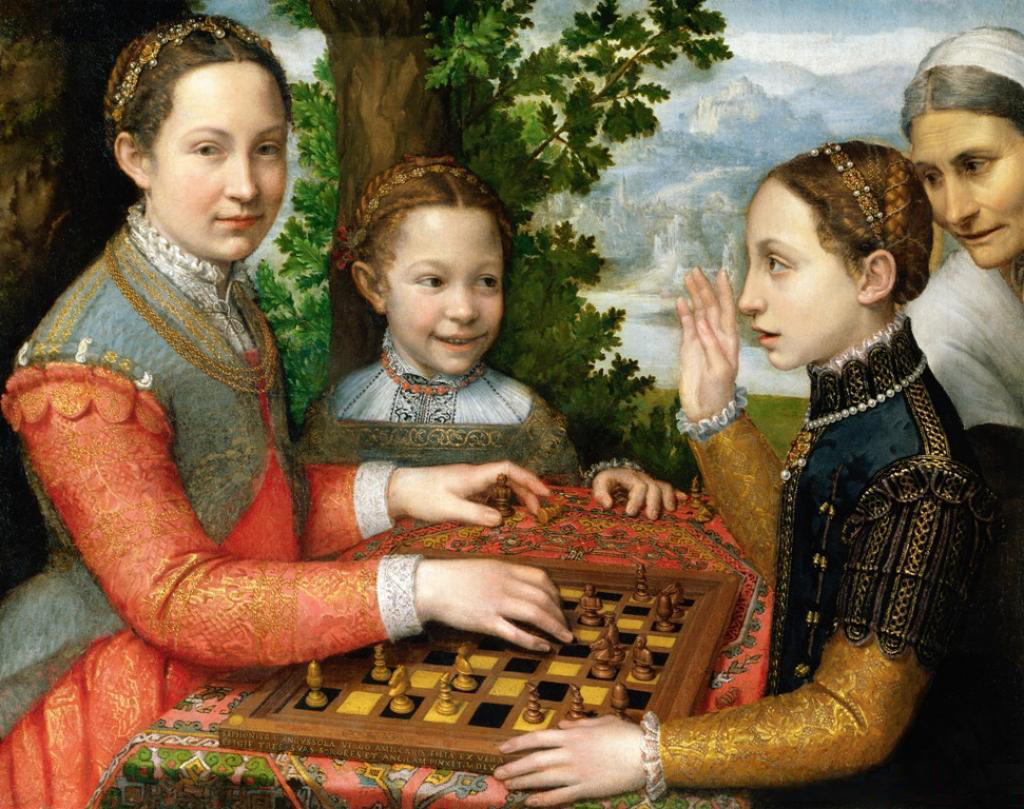
The Game of Chess, Sofonisba Anguissola, 1555

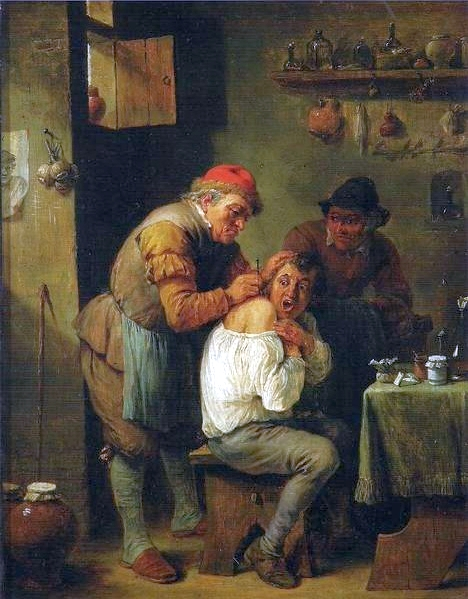
Operation, David Teniers the Younger, 1655

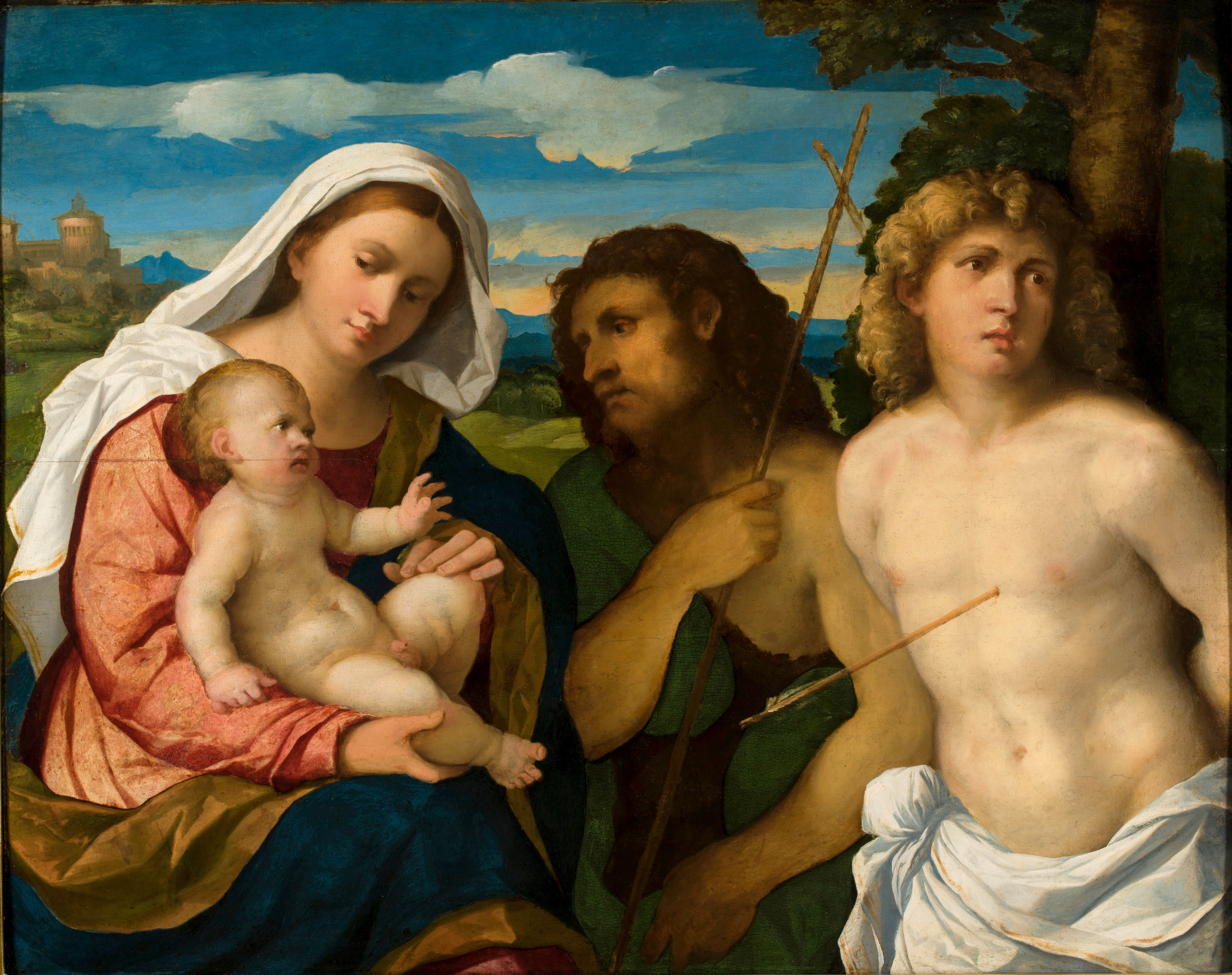
Sacred Conversation, Palma Vecchio, circa 1516–1518

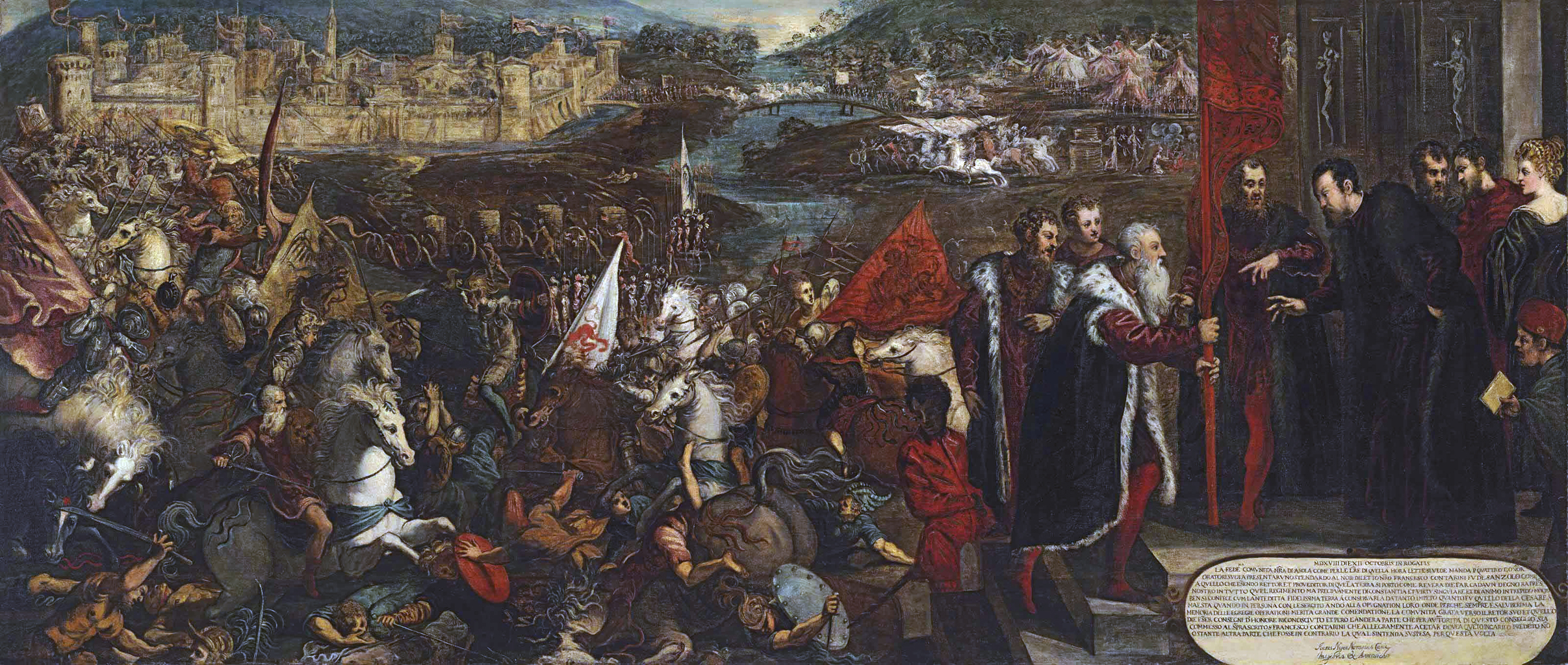
The Siege of Asola, Tintoretto, 1544–1545

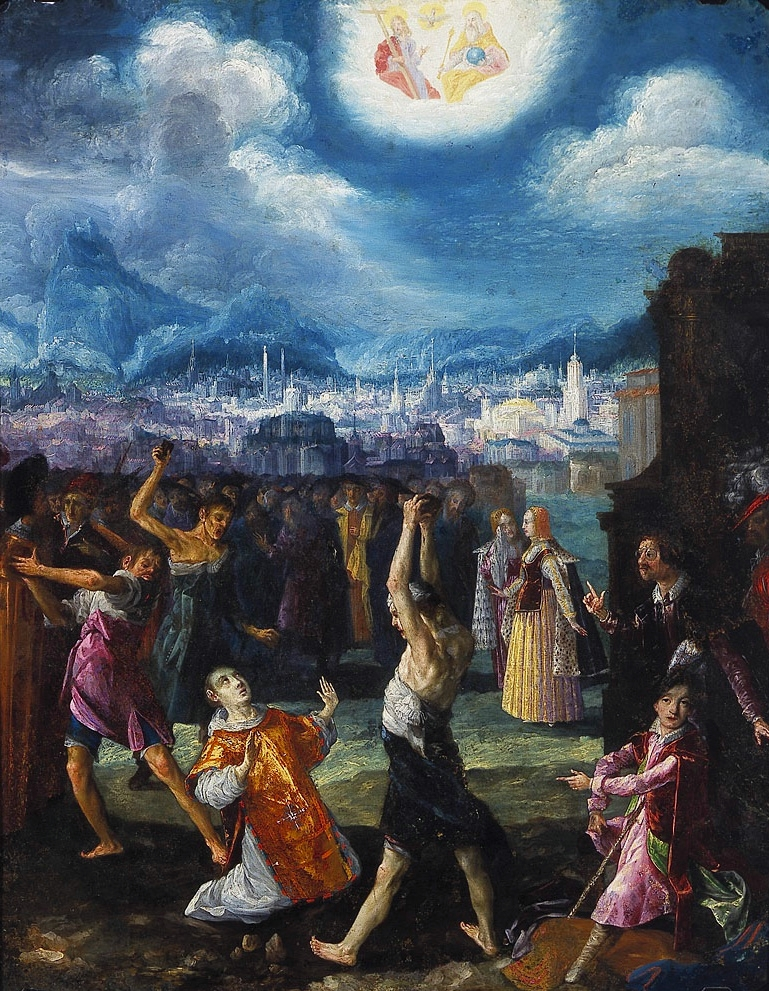
Stoning of Saint Stephen, Bartholomeus Strobel, ca. 1618

=== Polish art ===
Collection highlights

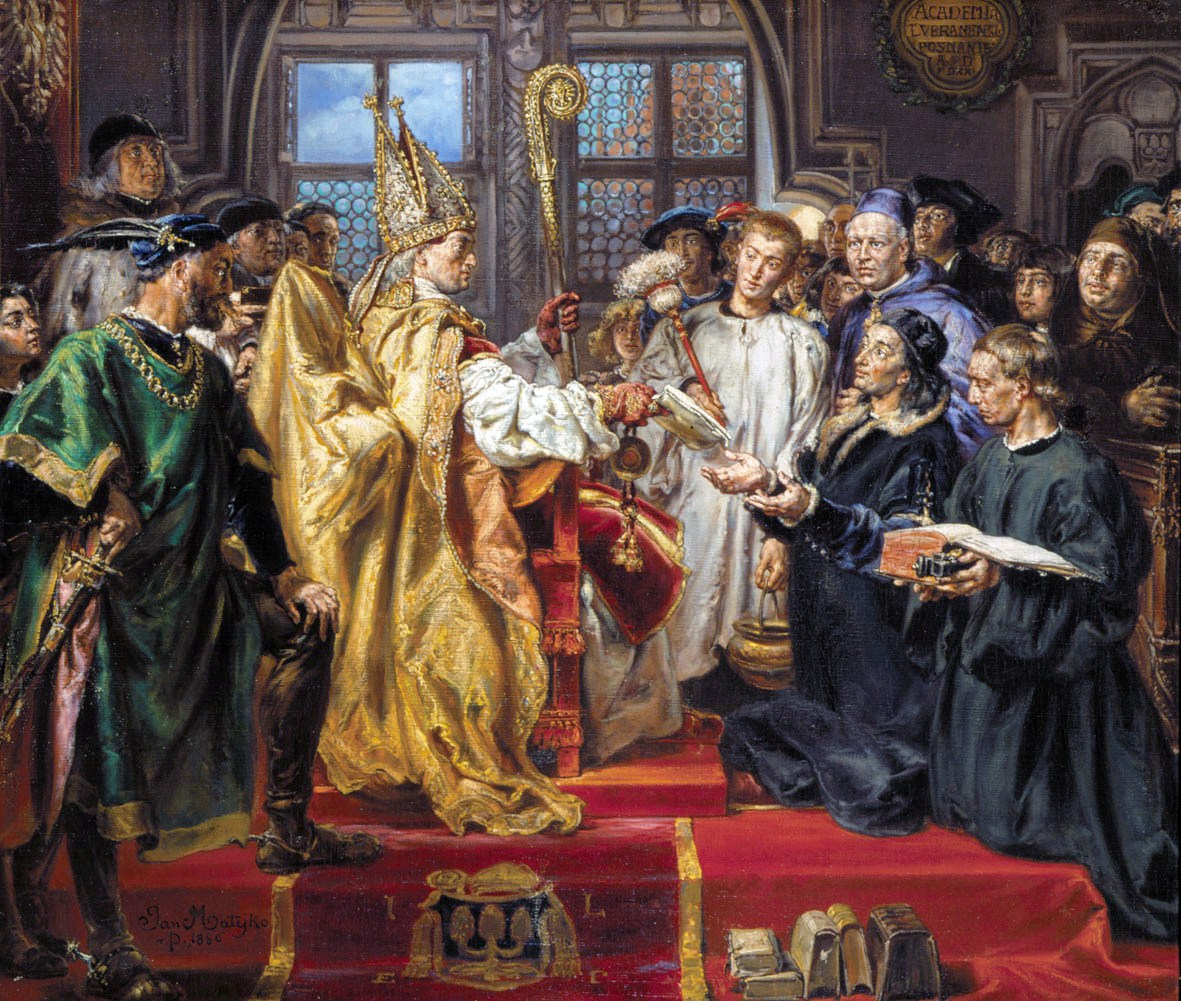
Founding of the Lubrański Academy in Poznań, Jan Matejko

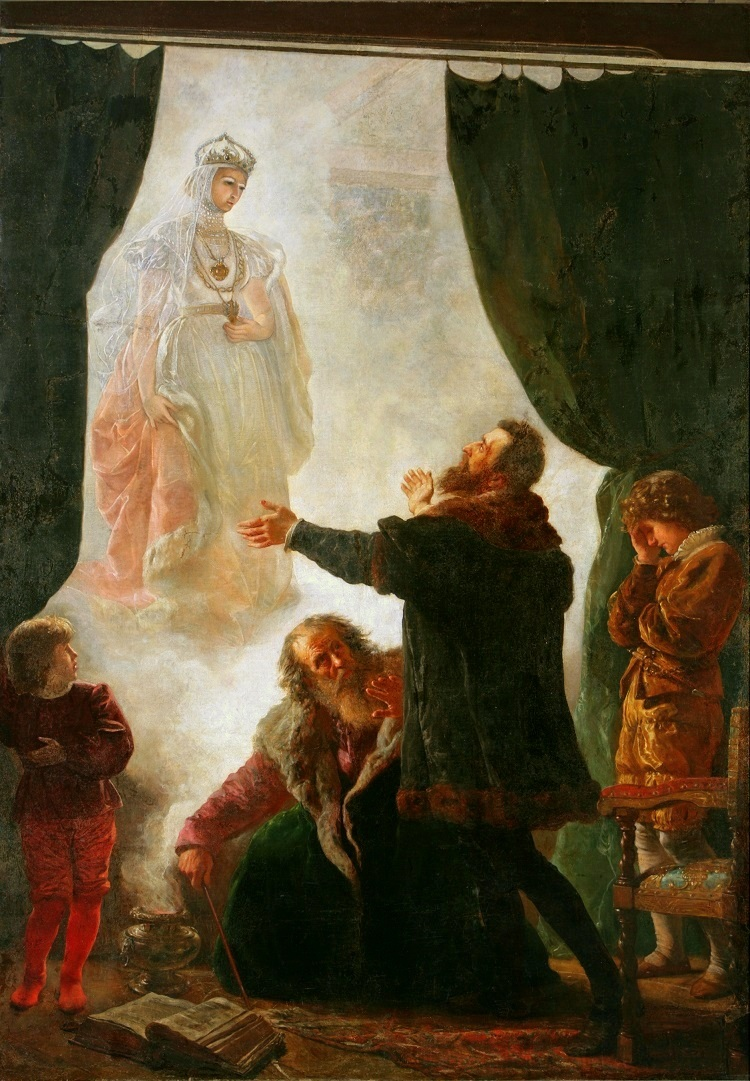
The Ghost of Barbara Radziwiłł, Wojciech Gerson

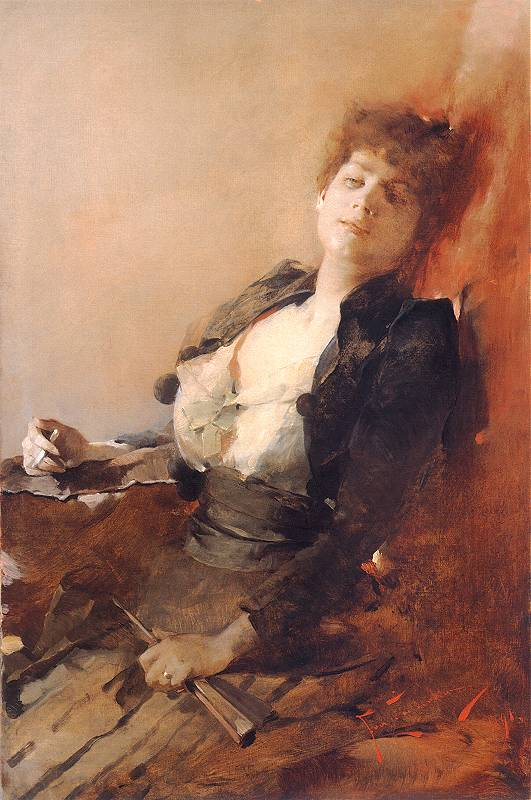
Portrait of a Woman with a Fan and a Cigarette, Franciszek Żmurko

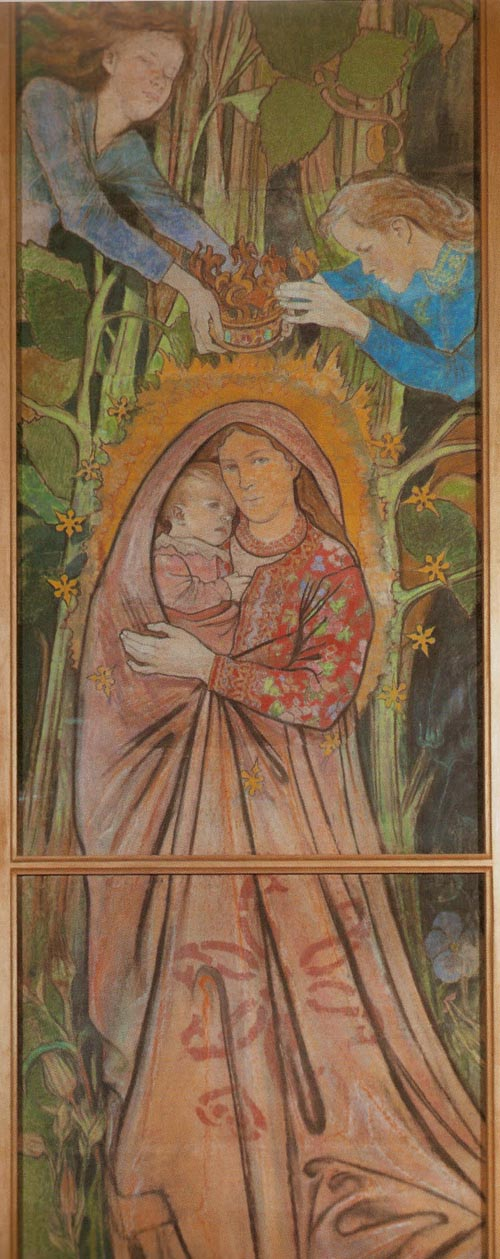
Madonna and Child, Stanisław Wyspiański

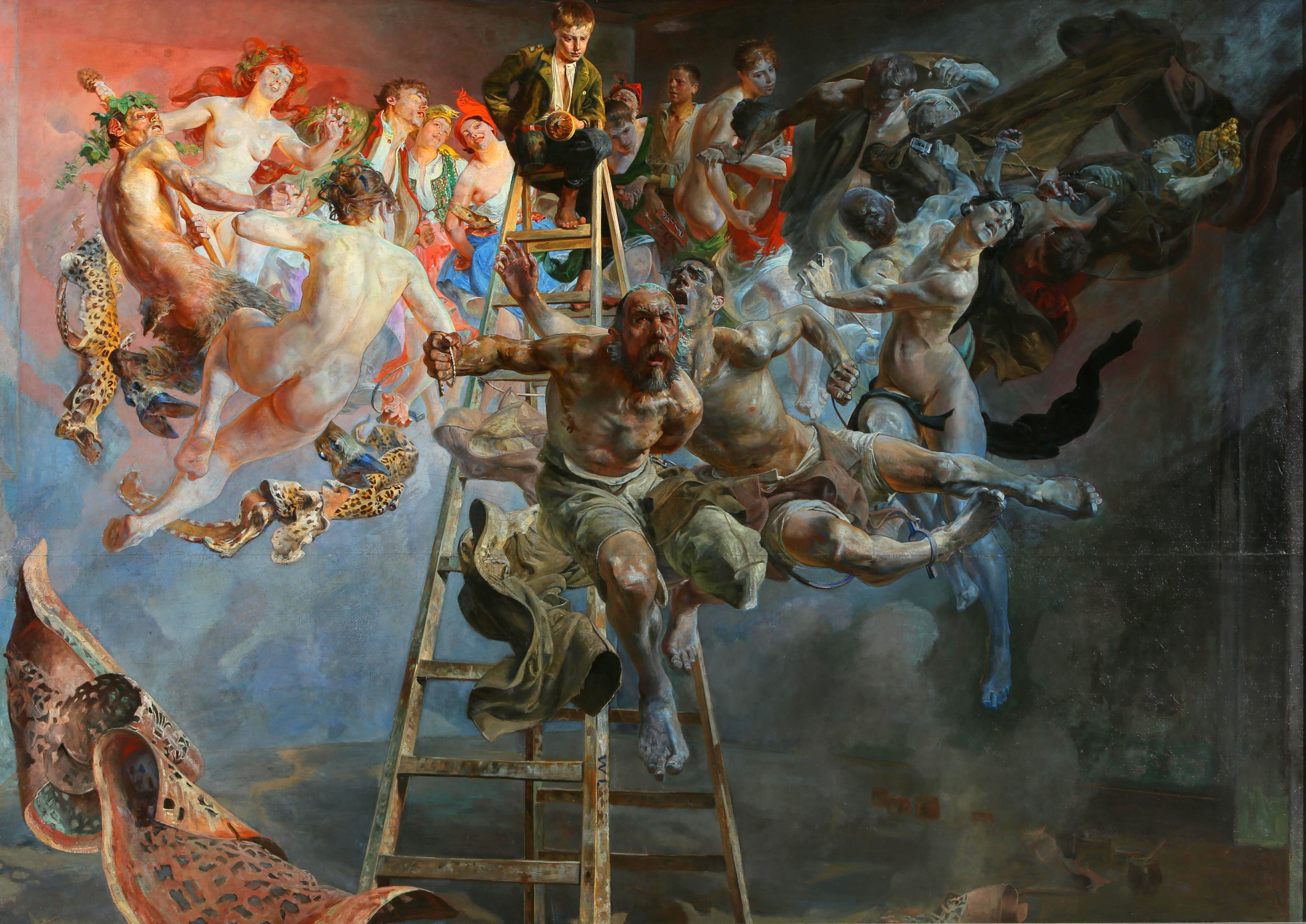
Vicious Circle, Jacek Malczewski

== See also ==
- National Museum, Kraków
- National Museum, Warsaw
- National Museum, Wrocław
- List of registered museums in Poland
