= Museum of Applied Arts, Poznań =

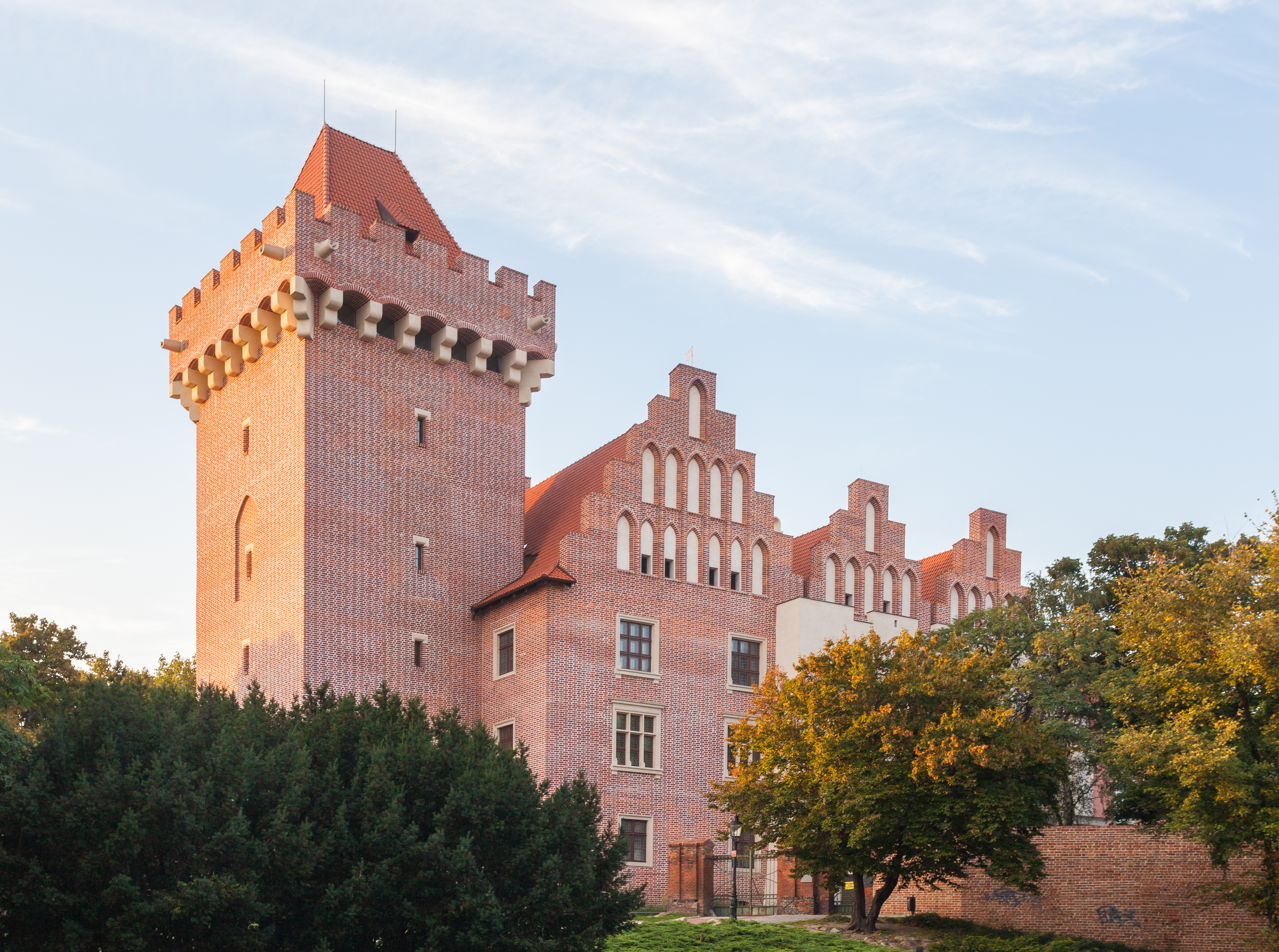
Poznań Royal Castle

Museum of Applied Arts in Poznań is a branch of the National Museum in Poznań, art museum opened in 1965 as the Museum of Arts and Crafts. Since 1991, in connection with the expansion of the collection profile and the change of the exhibition, under the current name. It is located in the Royal Castle in Poznań, built in 1249, initially as a residential tower of the PoznańPrince Przemysl I.

As a branch of the National Museum in Poznań, it is entered in the State Register of Museums kept by the minister in charge of culture and national heritage protection.

The Museum has 11,000 exhibits, such as fabrics, furniture, glass, silver, and others, which are exhibited in chronological order, from the Middle Ages to the present day. It was closed for a long time because of the reconstruction of the Royal Castle. The reopening took place on 26 March 2017. Part of the rooms of the reconstructed royal residence is intended for the exposition of the museum's collections. A lookout tower had been opened earlier.
