= Royal Castle, Poznań =

Royal castle during the reign of Przemysł I in Poznań, Poland

Poznań Royal Castle
- Zamek Królewski
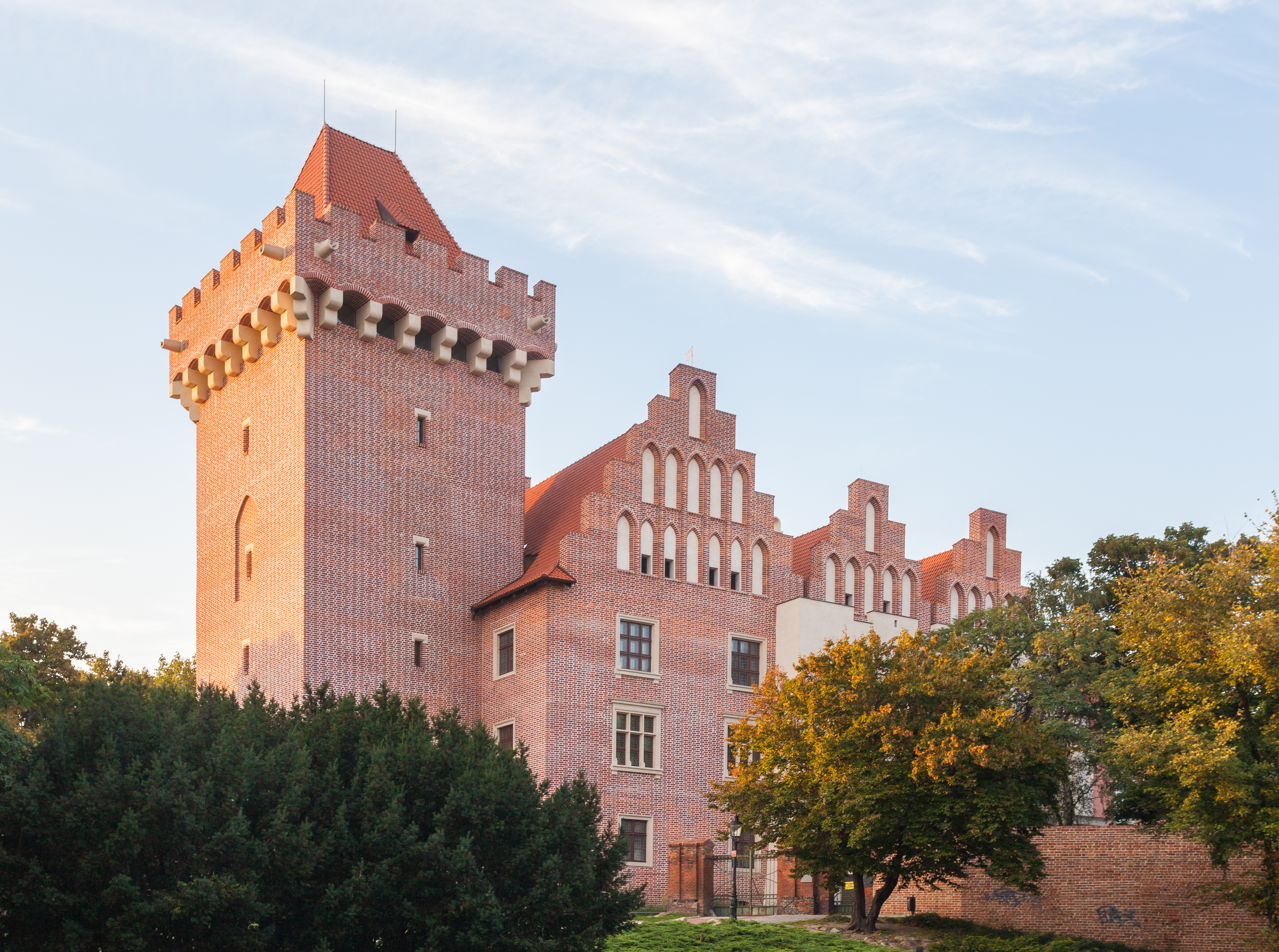
- Royal Castle in 2014

- Location within Poland

General information
- Type: Castle residency
- Architectural style: Romanesque, Gothic
- Location: Poznań, Poland, Poland
- Coordinates: 52°24′33″N 16°55′52″E
- Current tenants: Museum of Applied Arts, Poznań
- Construction started: 1249
- Completed: late 13th century
- Demolished: February 1945
- Client: Przemysł I

Design and construction
- Architect: Witold Milewski (reconstruction)

Website
- mnp.art.pl

The Royal Castle in Poznań (Polish: Zamek Królewski w Poznaniu) dates from 1249 and the reign of Przemysł I. Located in the Polish city of Poznań, it was largely destroyed during the Second World War but has since been partly rebuilt.

== History and modern view ==
Construction of the castle was probably started by Przemysł I in 1249 on hill later called Góra Zamkowa (Castle Mountain, Latin mons castrenis), and now better known as Góra Przemysława (Hill of Przemysł (or Przemysław)). The first building was a habitable tower made of bricks with a well inside, and the rest of the hill was surrounded by a rampart with a palisade. A small ducal residence was incorporated into the system of city walls in the late 13th century.

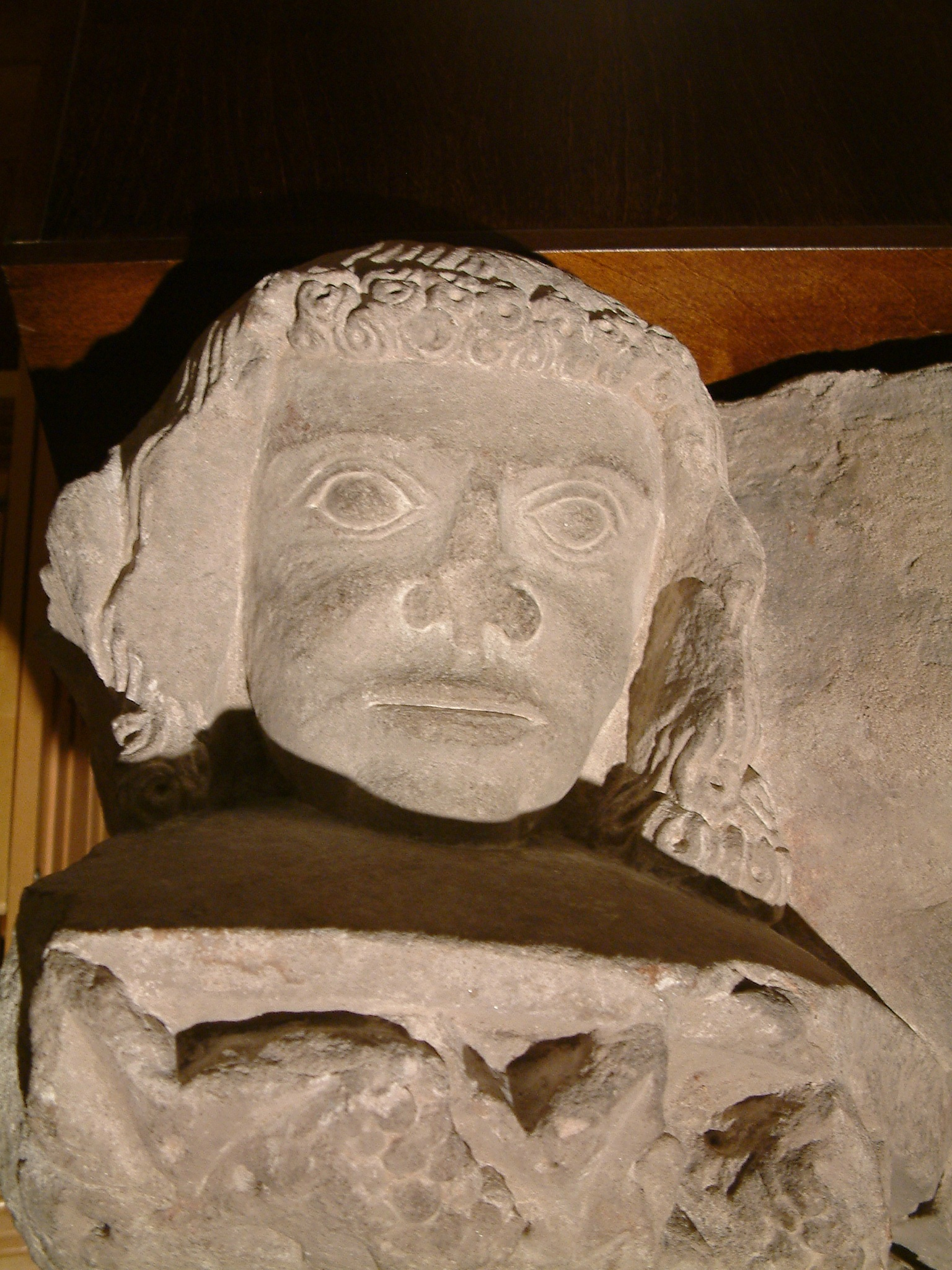
Head traditionally recognised as face of Przemysł I from the Church of Holiest Heart of Jesus and Mother of God of Consolation in Poznań.

The son of Przemysł I, Przemysł II, hoping for reunification of Poland under his rule decided to build a larger castle, more proper for a king. In 1295 Przemysł became king of Poland, but he was assassinated a year later. The castle was not finished. Work started by Przemysł was continued by a branch of the Piasts from Głogów ruling in Greater Poland, and finished before 1337. The castle served as the residence of Prince Casimir, then-governor of Greater Poland.

In 1337, the Royal Castle in Poznań was the largest castle in the Polish Kingdom, modelled after the palace of Henry I the Bearded in Legnica. The castle consisted of a tower built by Przemysł I and a huge building (63,0 m x 17,5 m) with three levels and a basement. It is uncertain whether the castle's characteristic roof, consisting of four parts, existed at that time.

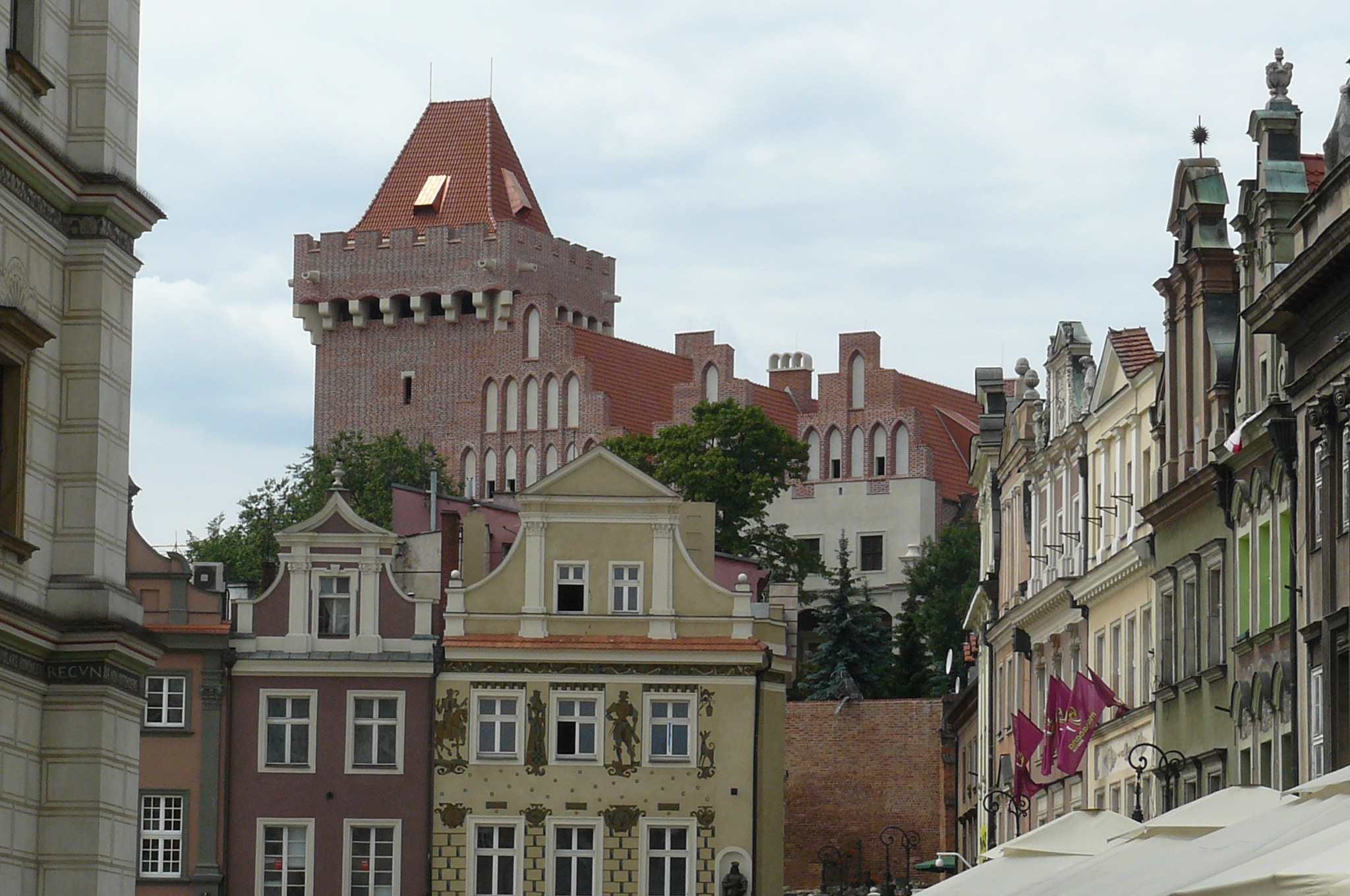
The castle seen from Old Town

Basements served as prisons and for storage of wines, and on the ground floor there were charring rooms. Those two floors were covered by vaults. Two higher floors probably had wooden ceilings. On the edges of first floor were representative chambers, and between them were habitual rooms. The whole second floor was occupied by a chamber for 2000 guests. On the south end of the large building was a defense tower. Since the reign of Władysław I the Elbow-high the castle served as the residence of starosta generalny of Greater Poland. Later only one king, Władysław II Jagiełło, ordered some minor work in castle.

During the fire of Poznań in 1536 the castle also burned. It was rebuilt in the Renaissance style by the governor of Greater Poland, Andrzej II Górka. In the next years the oldest part of castle was transformed into a kitchen. The castle was later destroyed during the Swedish invasion, sacked in 1704 by the armies of Russia and Saxony during Great Northern War, and in 1716 during Confederation of Tarnogród by the confederates. The castle was partially renovated in 1721, but it didn't stop the devastation. The last starosta generalny, Kazimierz Raczyński, rebuilt the remains of the medieval buildings into an archive (finished in 1783). In 1804, after the Second Partition of Poland, the Prussians demolished the southern part of the castle, replacing it by buildings which, together with Raczyński's archive served as the office of the local Regierungsbezirk. Later on the castle was also as a seat of the Court of Appeals and the State Archive (the castle served as an archive until 1939). During the battle for the Poznań Citadel, in February 1945, Przemysł Hill was in line of artillery fire, and the remaining part of the castle was demolished.

In the years 1959–1964 Raczyński's archive and part of Prussian building were rebuilt, and on base of the oldest tower stands a small pavilion called the Royal Kitchen (Kuchnia Królewska). Today the Castle holds a Museum of Utilitary Art (Muzeum Sztuki Użytkowej).

On 22 April 2002, a committee for rebuilding of the castle was founded. Still extant from previous construction are two-meter-wide supports from the thirteenth and fourteenth centuries, the inner walls of the basement and the western wall (up to 10 meters high) from the same period, and a slightly newer eastern wall (up to 7 or 8 meters high), now integrated into Raczyński's Building. On the surviving part of the castle are three plaques: the foundation plaque of Kazimierz Raczyński from 1783, one from 1993 marking the five-hundredth anniversary of homage of Grand Master of the Teutonic Order, Johann von Tiefen, and another plaque commemorating the seven-hundredth anniversary of the coronation of Przemysł II.

On 20 December 2010, work began on the total reconstruction of the demolished parts of the castle, and meticulous restoration of the surviving buildings.

== Important events in the castle's history ==
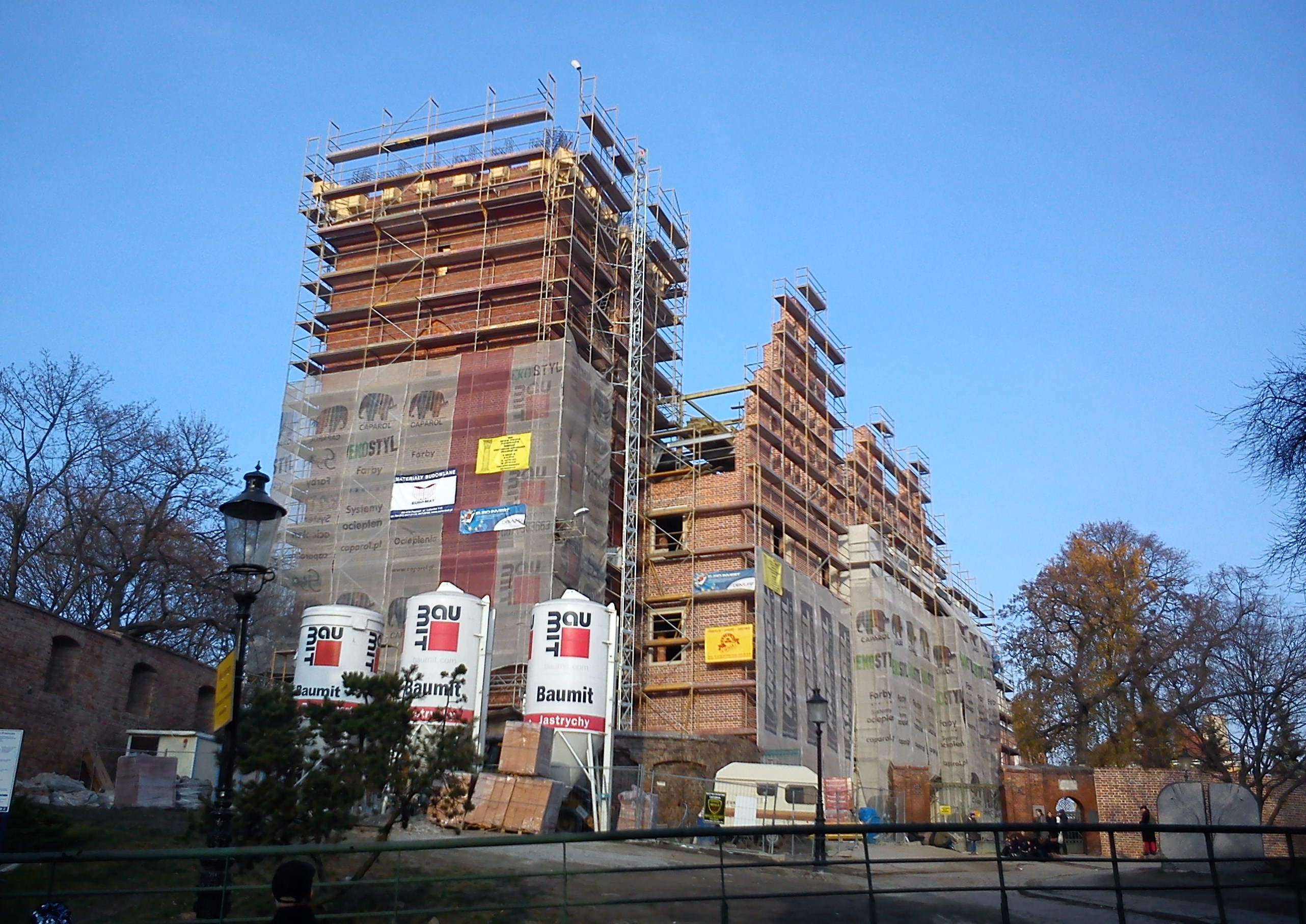
Re-construction in 2011

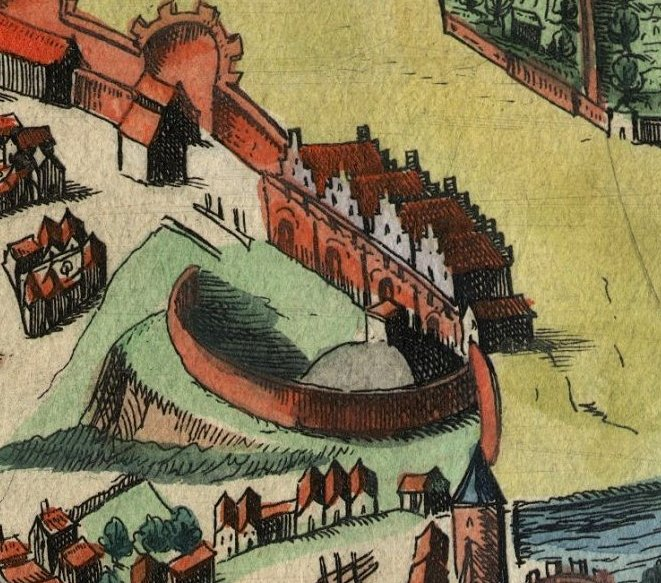
Royal Castle ca. 1617. Part of an illustration of Posnania from the book, Civitates Orbis Terrarum. Theatri praecipuarum totius mundi urbium liber sextus.

- 1249 – wedding of Salomea, sister of Przemysł I and Henryk II of Głogów
- 1251 – wedding of Euphemia, the youngest sister of Przemysł I, and Władysław of Opole, duke of Opole and Racibórz
- 14 October 1257 – Przemysł II was born in the castle
- 1 September 1288 – Elisabeth Richeza of Poland was born in the castle
- 1309 – Henry III of Głogów, pretender for Polish crown, stayed in the castle
- 1329–1331 – castle served as residence of Władysław I Łokietek
- 1337 – the peace treaty between Casimir III of Poland (Kazimierz Wielki) and John I of Bohemia was signed at the castle
- 1341 – wedding of Casimir III of Poland (Kazimierz Wielki) and Adelajda, daughter of Henry, Landgrave of Hesse
- 1343 – wedding of Bogislaw V, duke of Pomerania and Elizabeth of Silesia, daughter of Casimir III of Poland (Kazimierz Wielki)
- 1372 and 1373 – visits of Elisabeth of Poland, Queen of Hungary
- 1381 – visit of Louis I of Hungary
- 1386 – visit of Jadwiga of Poland and Władysław II Jagiełło
- 1424 – visit of Eric of Pomerania
- 1433 – wedding of Bogislaw IV, duke of Pomerania-Stolp (Słupsk) and Mary, daughter of Siemowit IV of Płock, duke of Masovia
- few visits of Casimir IV Jagiellon
- 29 May 1493 – homage of Johann von Tiefen to John I of Poland
- few visits of Sigismund I the Old
- 1574 – visit of Henry de Valois
- few visits of Sigismund III Vasa
- few visits of Władysław IV Vasa
- 1657–1658 – John II Casimir of Poland stays in the castle for winter with Queen Marie Louise Gonzaga. During this visit the war council with Stefan Czarniecki described in Dąbrowski's Mazurka by Józef Wybicki took place. The author started his lawyer career in 1765 in the castle.

== Legends ==
According to legend, Przemysł Hill was created by dark powers. When Mieszko I was baptized, the Devil, angry, decided to sink the entire city of Poznań. He pulled out one of the hills near Gniezno, and, with a group of demons, tried to block the flow of the Warta. However, the evil forces started to celebrate their victory too early; their noisy behavior awoke the roosters, which began to crow. The devil and his demons were so scared that they left the hill on the bank of the Warta.

Another legend is connected with the mysterious murder of Ludgarda, wife of Przemysł II of Poland, probably strangled by servants in the bath or in her bedroom on 14 December 1283. The Duke was connected with this murder because the Duchess could not give him a son. The Foundation of the Female Monastery of Dominicans in Poznań, created near the end of 1238, was said to be Przemysł's reconciliation for this act. However, contemporary chronicles mention only unclear circumstances of Ludgarda's death. The first clear connection of Przemysł and this assassination is mentioned in the Chronicle of Oliwa, which is from the 14th century, and the chronicle of Ernst von Kirchberg, which dates to approximately 1370. Jan Długosz, in his chronicles, writes only about the fact that people were talking about this connection.

It has also been said that ghost of Ludgarda, seen as a White Lady, walked in the chambers and on the walls of the Royal Castle; under the walls was seen the Black Knight, who cried for the Duchess at her funeral.

== See also ==
- Castles in Poland
- Imperial Castle, Poznań
