= Siege of Asola (1483) =

The siege of Asola, a city controlled by the Republic of Venice, took place between 27 September and 12 October 1483 during the War of Ferrara, which saw the Republic of Venice and an anti-Venetian league, known as the League of Ferrara, pitted against each other. The anti-Venetian coalition included the Duchy of Ferrara, the Papal States, Milan, and Naples.

== History ==
The War of Ferrara was fought between the Republic of Venice and an anti-Venetian league, formed by Ferrara, the Papal States, Milan, and Naples. The war was fought over border disputes and the control of lucrative salt-producing territories, with Venice seeking to expand its holdings at the expense of Ferrara and the Pope opposing Venetian encroachment over papal influence.

The capture of Asola was part of the military maneuvers that led the armies of the League to move, in the first half of September 1483, from Lombardy towards Veneto, despite the resistance of the Marquis of Mantua Federico I Gonzaga, who seemed to have signed a non-belligerence pact with Venice, in order to be spared from a possible invasion of its territories, between the Duchy of Milan and the Serenissima. Even the Duke of Milan Gian Galeazzo Maria Sforza did not approve of the undertaking and took the field directly, but was stationed near Cremona. The approach maneuvers from Goito and Casaloldo, which had surrendered to the Gonzaga, towards Asola were conducted by the Duke of Calabria Alfonso of Aragon and by Francesco Secco.

== Outcome ==
The fortification of Asola, consisting of a moat, high walls and 14 cylindrical towers, was built by the Venetians between 1458 and 1482, but was poorly suited to repelling attacks with firearms. Six league bombards were brought under the walls in the days before the attack and used to open large breaches in the walls. The fall of Asola (on 12 October 1483) was celebrated with the triumphant entry into the town of Francesco Gonzaga, son of the Marquis Federico from Canneto and who had never fought in battle, accompanied by Secco.

The town of Asola was returned to Venice on 7 August 1484 with the Peace of Bagnolo, shortly after the death of the Marquis Federico Gonzaga on 14 July. The town had to endure another famous siege in 1516. However, that siege was unsuccessful.
