= Asola, Lombardy =

Asola Àsula (Lombard)
- Comune
- Città di Asola
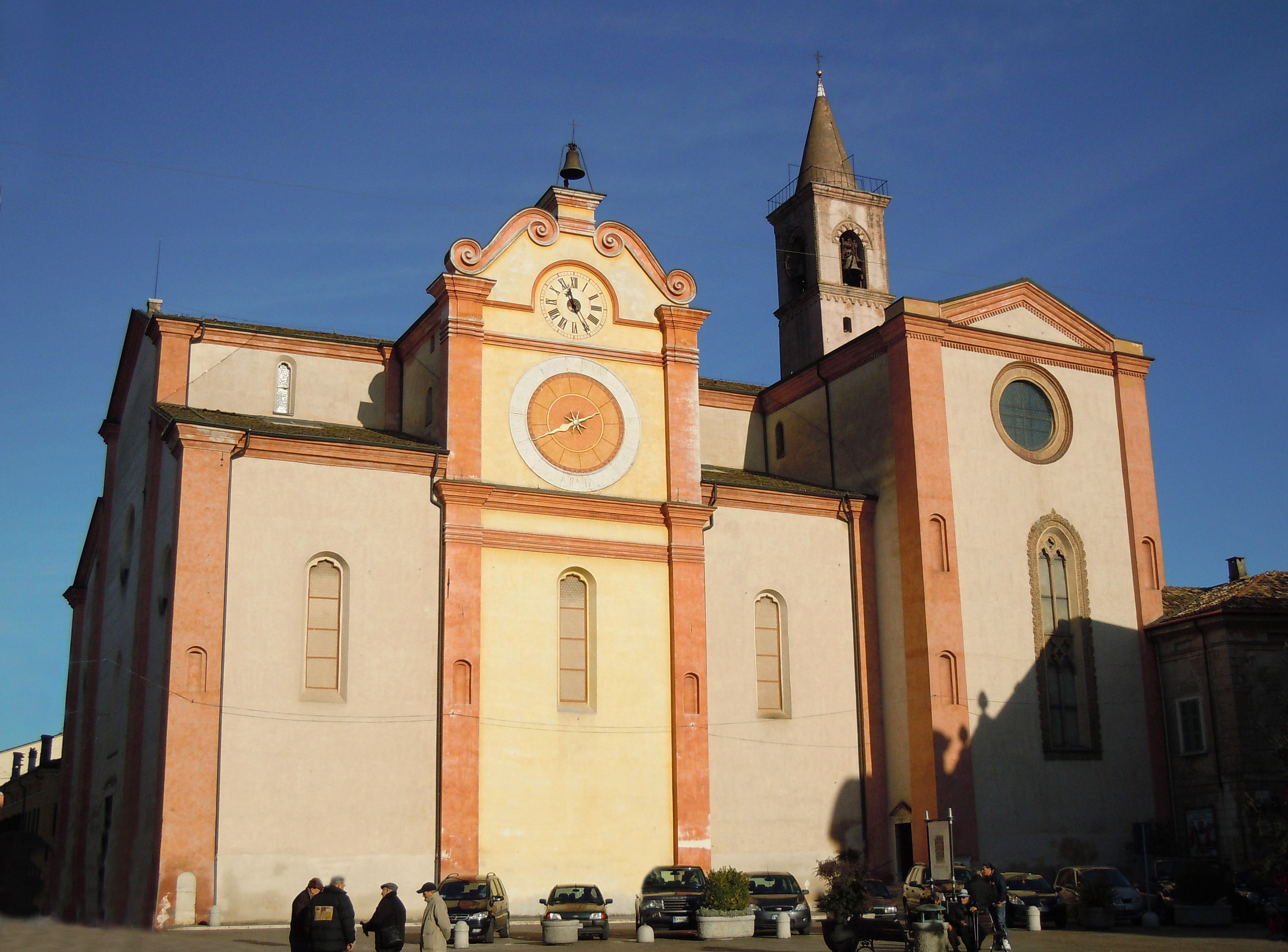
- Cathedral of S. Andrea, Asola

- Coat of arms

- Location within Italy Location within Lombardy
- Coordinates: 45°13′N 10°25′E
- Country: Italy
- Region: Lombardy
- Province: Mantua (MN)
- Frazioni: Barchi, Castelnuovo, Gazzuoli, San Pietro, Sorbara

Government
  - Mayor: Moreno Romanelli (Lista Civica - Più Asola)

Area
  - Total: 73.48 km^{2} (28.37 sq mi)
- Elevation: 42 m (138 ft)

Population (28 February 2017)
  - Total: 10,067
  - Density: 137.0/km^{2} (354.8/sq mi)
- Demonym: Asolani
- Time zone: UTC+1 (CET)
  - Summer (DST): UTC+2 (CEST)
- Postal code: 46041
- Dialing code: 0376
- Website: Official website

Asola (Upper Mantovano: Àsula) is a comune in the province of Mantua, Lombardy (northern Italy). It received the honorary title of city with a presidential decree of October 23, 1951.

In 1516, when it was part of the Republic of Venice, it was unsuccessfully besieged by the troops of the Austrian Maximilian I. The event is portrayed in a painting by Tintoretto, The Siege of Asola.

The local civic museum is titled Museo Civico Goffredo Bellini.

== Physical geography ==
The comune is traditionally referred to as belonging to the territory of Alto Mantovano, the area of the province of Mantua located north of the provincial capital close to the morainic amphitheater of Lake Garda.

It borders the province of Brescia to the west, and is located at an altitude of 42 m (138 ft) above sea level.

It lies halfway between Mantua and Cremona, from which it is about 35 km (22 mi), while it is about 50 km (31 mi) from Brescia.

== Anthropic geography ==
Post-Risorgimento urban development has kept the elegance of the town center intact. The large Piazza XX Settembre, flanked by comfortable porticoes, is overlooked by the cathedral and the town hall; from here the main streets radiate out again.

== Climate ==
Asola's climate is typical of the upper Po Valley of the temperate subcontinental type: winters are moderately harsh, with little rain and foggy days; summers are hot and muggy with thunderstorm-like precipitation; springs and autumns are generally rainy.

== Origins of the name ==
Asola is diminutive of the Latin "Ansa," curve of the fiume Chiese near which the city was founded.

== History ==
Asola stands in an area frequented since prehistoric times, as evidenced by the finds preserved in the local museum. Finds from the Iron Age, a period characterized by the settlement of Celtic populations in the territory, are sporadic.

Subsequently, the area is affected by Roman occupation around the 1st century BC, attested mainly by funerary monuments and grave goods.

In the final years of the Middle Ages, around the 12th and 13th centuries, with its own fortified fortress it falls under the comital jurisdiction of Brescia controlled by the Visconti, in 1348 it passes to the dominion of the Malatesta, then again to the Venetians and later to the Gonzaga.

In 1440, Asola decided to freely subject itself to the Serenissima, becoming an extremely important border fortress for the Republic's control of the mainland.

Asola would remain under the control of Venice until the arrival of Napoleon in 1797. The arrival of the French then marked the return to the Mantuan territory to which it would remain linked even in 1814 with its annexation to Austrian rule.

Also active in Risorgimento events, it fought for national independence with the efforts of patriots such as Don Ottaviano Daina and Francesco Fario.

In 1859, it was liberated and annexed to the Kingdom of Piedmont and finally to united Italy.

== Monuments and places of interest ==
=== Religious architecture ===
==== Cattedrale di Sant'Andrea ====
Built beginning in 1472 on the basis of an earlier building, the cathedral today is a remarkable example of late Lombard Gothic architecture and preserves many important works of art: an Antegnati organ, canvases by Moretto, Romanino, Lattanzio Gambara, and Jacopo Palma il Giovane, the 15th-century Polyptych of Mercy by Antonio della Corna, and other later, 17th- and 18th-century artworks.

==== Chiesa di San Rocco ====
Also called the Chiesa dell'Ospedale, it was begun in 1475 in an area of the old castle and was consecrated in 1506.

Probably destroyed during the Siege of 1516, it was rebuilt in 1539 at the expense of the community from a design projected by Cristoforo Mantuano de Leno.

==== Chiesa dei Disciplini Bianchi ====
On Via Oberdan, next to the cathedral, is the church named after the confraternity of the Disciplini Bianchi, who made it their headquarters. It is also called the Chiesa di Santa Maria Della Misericordia.

==== Chiesa di Santa Maria del Lago ====
Also called Chiesa dei Disciplini Rossi or in Betlemme, it is the church of lower Asola in the Santa Maria district on Via Nazario Sauro. It was built in 1570 and stands on the remains of an older chapel dedicated to St. Mary, much venerated as early as the early 16th century.

=== Civic architecture ===
==== Palazzo Municipale ====
Located in Piazza XX Settembre, it is the seat of the Municipality of Asola. In the north corner of the building opens an elegant Loggia Veneta built in 1610 from a project design by architect Lantana.

==== Fontana di Ercole ====
Monumental fountain depicting Hercules crushing the hydra, marble copy of the work by sculptor Giovanni Antonio Carra (16th century).

==== Gran Caffe Liberty Enoteca ====
Local used to house the Archivio Storico Comunale, in 1811 it became the seat of the Magistrate's Court and later Caffè del Popolo, Gran Caffè Savoia, Caffè Centrale and finally Gran Caffè Liberty Enoteca. It preserves Art Nouveau interiors, and was recognized as a historic establishment of regional importance by D.G.R. VII/1733 of January 18, 2006. Open since 1936.

==== Palazzo Monte dei Pegni ====
Located along Via Garibaldi, opposite the facade of the cathedral. It was renovated in 1828 in a neoclassical style. Historical seat of the Circolo Filatelico Numismatico Città di Asola (Philatelic and Numismatic Club of Asola), since 2006 it has housed the Goffredo Bellini Civic Museum.

==== Palazzo Terzi ====
Located in Via Garibaldi, it has a sober facade with the balcony from which Garibaldi looked out on April 28, 1862, to speak to the people of Asola. It is characterized inside by the presence of a large English garden that hides an icehouse below ground level.

==== Palazzo Beffa Negrini ====
Located on Via Garibaldi, immediately after the Palazzo Terzi. This grand 18th-century palace retains a Baroque facade adorned with marble trophies and a solemn portal. It was the residence of the Counts Beffa Negrini, one of the most notable families in Asola.

==== Teatro Sociale ====
The building, located on Via Piave, was inaugurated in 1891. It features a late Neoclassical facade and on the eaves cornice statues depicting masks from the commedia dell'arte. On the right side remains the Romanesque apse of St. Erasmus and an epigraph commemorating the origins of the church itself. Ceasing to be used for theatrical performances, it was used as a movie theater in the second half of the 20th century.

==== Loggia delle Clarisse ====
Between the Palazzo Monte dei Pegni and the Cassa di Risparmio, on Via Piave, there is what remains of the Antico Convento delle Clarisse (1496), characterized by a loggia with slender columns.

==== Colleggio Schiantarelli ====
Located on Via Mazzini, it features typical neoclassical architecture. Count Paolo Tosio in 1825 commissioned architect Vantini to build the palace that was to house his picture gallery, now in Brescia. Instead, the palace became a boarding school in 1863, and its inscription still remains to remind us of its history. Since 2002 it has housed the offices of the ASL of Asola.

==== Ospedale ====
The Ospedale di Asola, once an autonomous institution, now depends on the Azienda Ospedaliera Carlo Poma of Mantua. It is an acute-care hospital that provides health responses to patients, mainly from the provinces of Mantua, Brescia and Cremona, representing the reference health facility of the Asolano district with a potential catchment area of at least 50,000 inhabitants.

==== Vecchi Mulini ====
The old mills, now in an advanced state of disrepair, are located on the Strada Bassa per Casalmoro as you leave the town northward.

==== La Chiusa ====
This is a damming of the course of the Fiume Chiese regulated by a series of sluice gates with the purpose of drawing water from the river for irrigating fields. It is located near the locality Camporegio in the countryside south of Asola.

The Municipal Library "Andrea Torresano"

The main library is named after Italian Renaissance printer Andrea Torresano who was born in Asola.

=== Military architecture ===
==== Castello di Asola ====
Asola Castle was a stronghold presumably dating back to the 12th century. It was destroyed and rebuilt several times; no traces remain today.

==== Fortezza di Asola ====
The existence of a fortified fortress is attested as early as the 12th century. In the aftermath of the Act of Dedication, Venice promoted an articulated program of fortification of the city that was implemented from 1458 to 1483, remaining virtually unchanged until Asola lost its primary role in the Republic's military chessboard in favor of the defensive bulwark of Orzinuovi. The fortress thus remains unchanged in graphic representations in its irregular quadrilateral shape, whose perimeter was bordered by walls with fourteen cylindrical towers protected on the outside by a moat and on the inside by an embankment.

To the northeast stood the fortress, square with cylindrical corner towers. There were two gates: Porta Fuori to the east, Porta Chiese to the west, each protected by a ravelin.

At the head of the fortress was a governor with a military garrison; at the old castle, near the Torre delle Polveri, was another minor garrison, under the orders of a Magnifico Castellano.

== Infrastructure and transportation ==
=== Roads ===
The municipality is traversed by Strada statale 343, to which Asola gives its name.

=== Railways ===
The Asola station, located on the Brescia-Parma railway, is served by regional trains operated by Trenord and timed on an hourly basis as part of the service contract stipulated with the Lombardy Region.

In the past it offered connections with two suburban tramways, the Cremona-Asola, operating between 1929 and 1955, and the Mantova-Asola, operating between 1886 and 1933.

=== Urban mobility ===
Asola is connected to Mantua by two APAM lines: one direct to Castiglione delle Stiviere and the other to Mantua; and by ARRIVA ITALIA s.p.a by a direct line to Cremona.

== Twin towns ==
- Leingarten, Germany, since 2004
- Lésigny, France, since 2004
