= Siege of Asola (1516) =

16th century siege

- Part of the War of the League of Cambrai
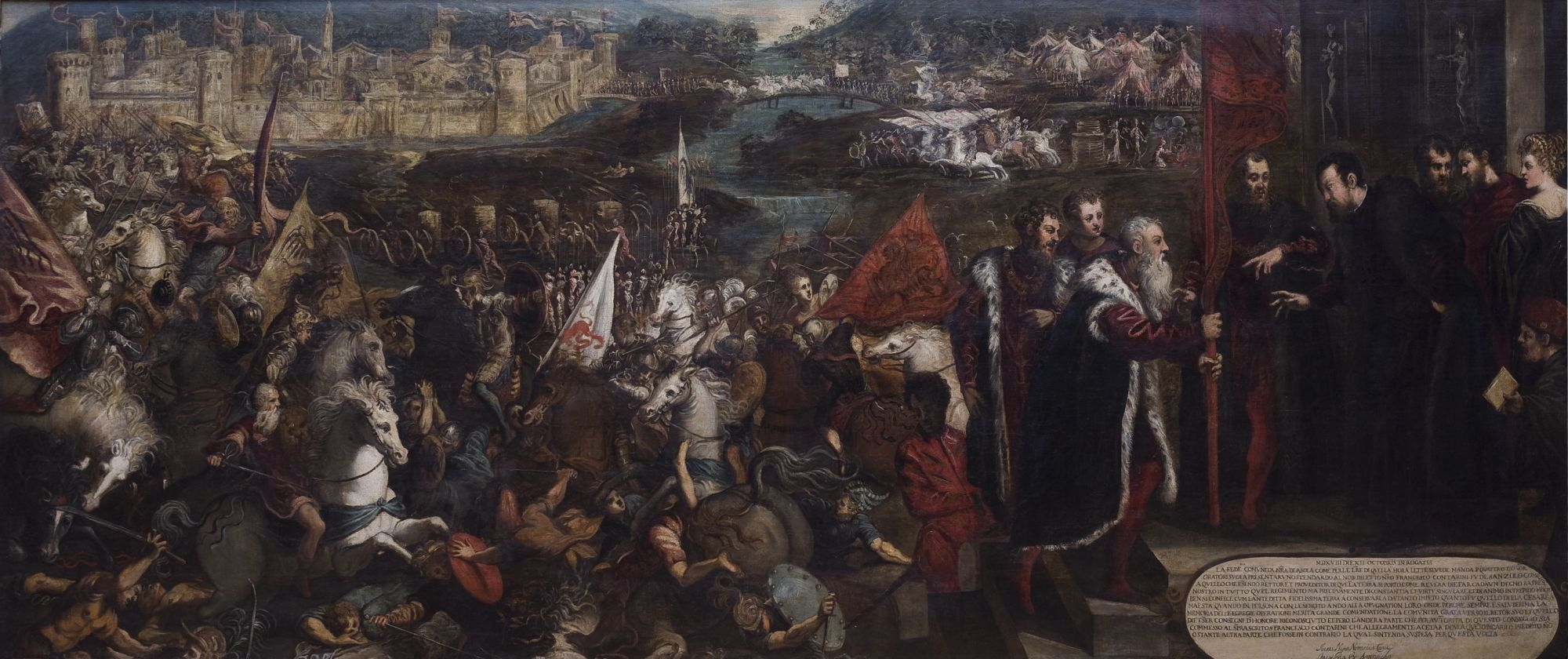
- Tintoretto, Siege of Asola, 1544–1545
Date	16–19 March 1516
Location	Asola, Italy
Result	Venetian victory

Belligerents
Republic of Venice	Holy Roman Empire

Commanders and leaders
Francesco Contarini; Gian Francesco Daina; Rizino d'Asola; Antonio II Martinengo di Padernello; Pietro da Longhena; Borghese dal Borgo; Frate da Pavia	Maximilian I, Holy Roman Emperor

The siege of Asola took place from 16 to 19 March 1516 and saw the Republic of Venice and the imperial army personally commanded by Emperor Maximilian I of Habsburg pitted against each other. The siege was unsuccessful.

== History ==
The town of Asola had passed under the control of the Gonzagas of Mantua since 1509. In October 1515, it was recovered by the Venetian militias, who installed their administrator. In 1516, Emperor Maximilian I decided to descend on Italy, eager to regain Lombardy and with it Milan. Andrea Gritti, former superintendent of Asola and future doge of Venice, took to the field to counter his advance. The emperor decided to attack and conquer Asola, which was surrounded and bombarded by the imperial troops on 19 March 1516.

== Outcome ==
All the citizens, especially Rizino d'Asola at the head of 100 lances, strenuously resisted the three-day siege, which ended on 19 March with the retreat of Maximilian I, who retreated towards the Tyrol. The Senate of the Republic of Venice recognized the loyalty and value of the Asolo people, restoring the privileges enjoyed since 1484 . From then onwards, Asola remained Venetian until 1797, the year of the fall of the Republic.

A Tintoretto painting, called The Siege of Asola, portrays the event.
