= The Siege of Asola =

Painting by Tintoretto

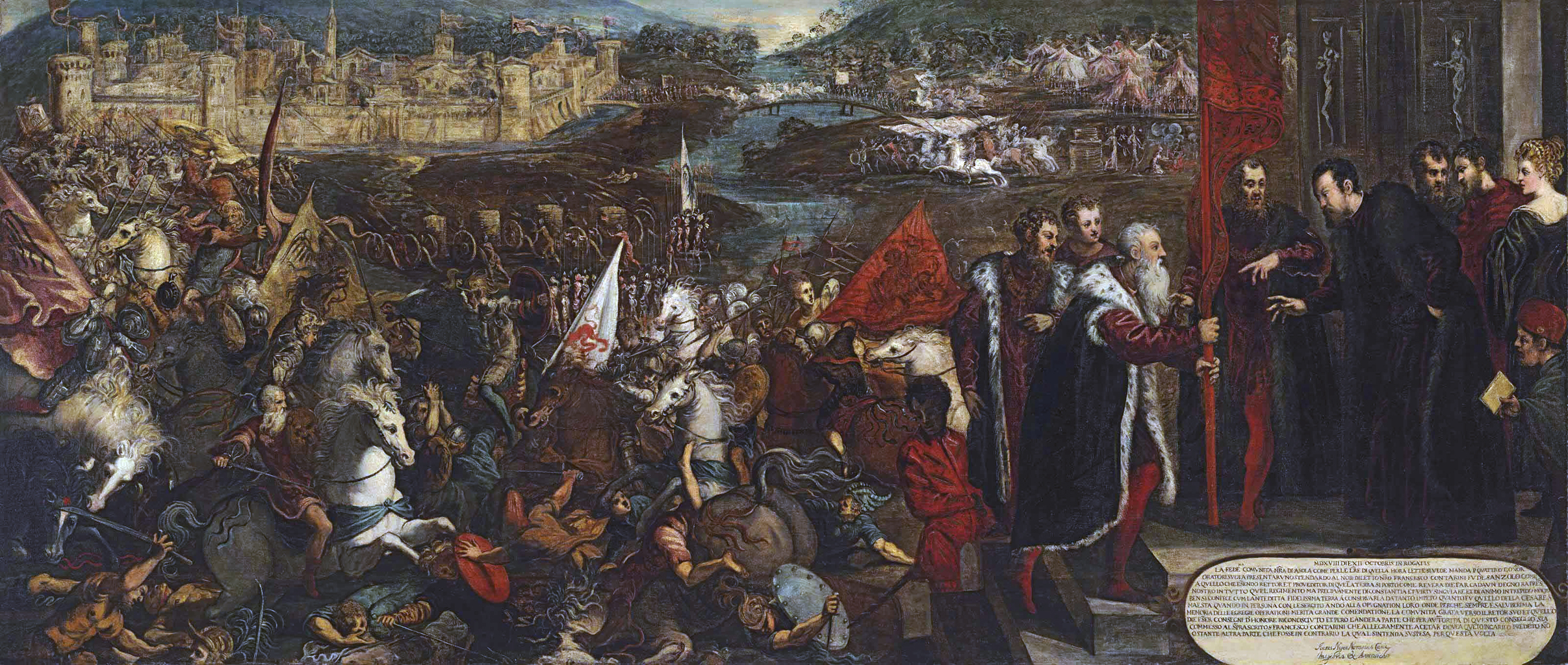
- Artist: Tintoretto
- Year: 1544–1545
- Medium: Oil on canvas
- Dimensions: 197 cm × 467.5 cm (78 in × 184.1 in)
- Location: Private collection

The Siege of Asola is a painting by the Italian late Renaissance master Tintoretto, executed in 1544–1545. It is in a private collection.

== Description ==
The canvas portrays two scenes. From the left to the middle is, in the foreground, a clash of knights occurred during the siege of the Venetian town of Asola by the troops of the Austrian emperor Maximilian I in 1516. Among the clashing soldiers is the banner of Asola, the fortress itself being shown in the background.

On the right is depicted the homage of the citizens of Asola to the Venetian provveditore (curator) Francesco Contarini, the nobleman who organized the city's defence and forced Maximilian's troop to withdraw.

== Art market ==
The painting sold for £1,142,500 at Christie's London, on 8 July 2014.
