= Aldus Manutius =

Italian printer and humanist (1449/1452–1515)

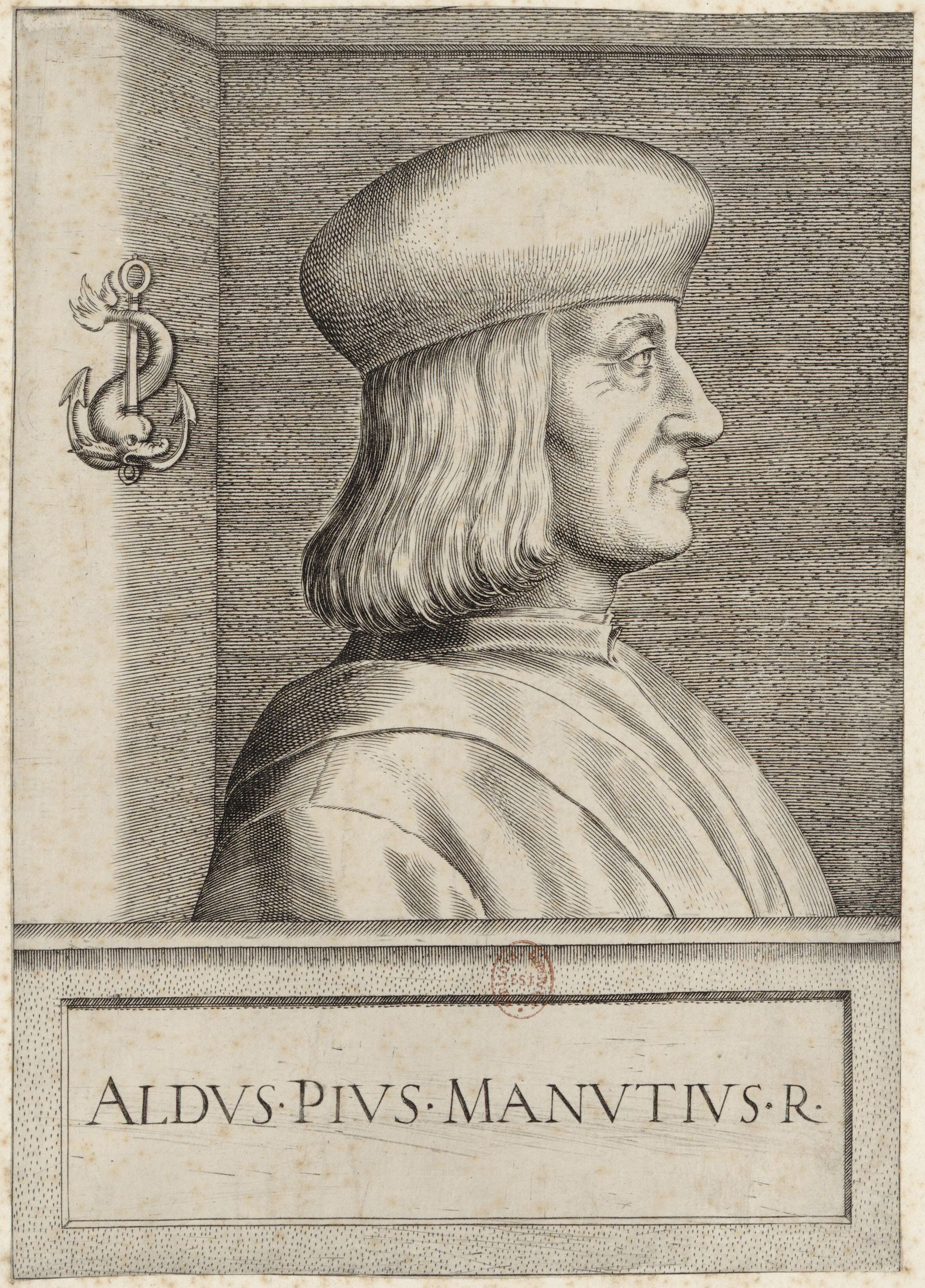
- Manutius, illustration in Vita di Aldo Pio Manuzio (1759)
- Born: Aldo Pio Manuzio c. 1449/1452; Bassiano, Papal States
- Died: 6 February 1515 (aged around 65); Venice, Republic of Venice
- Other name: Aldus Manutius the Elder
- Occupations: Renaissance humanist; printer; publisher
- Known for: Founding the Aldine Press at Venice; founding the New Academy
- Spouse: Maria Torresani (m. 1505)
- Children: 5, including Paulus
- Relatives: Aldus Manutius the Younger (grandson)

Aldus Pius Manutius (/ˈɔːldəs məˈnjuːʃiəs/ AWL-dəs mə-NEW-shee-əs; Italian: Aldo Pio Manuzio [ˈaldo ˈpiːo maˈnuttsjo]; c. 1449/1452 – 6 February 1515), also known as Aldus Manutius the Elder to distinguish him from his grandson, was an Italian printer and humanist who founded the Aldine Press. Manutius devoted the later part of his life to publishing and disseminating rare texts. His interest in preservation of Greek manuscripts marked him as an innovative publisher of his age dedicated to the editions he produced. Aldus Manutius introduced the small portable book format with his enchiridia, which revolutionized personal reading and are the predecessor of the modern paperback book. He also helped to standardize use of punctuation including the comma and the semicolon.

Manutius wanted to produce Greek texts for his readers because he believed that works by Aristotle or Aristophanes in their original Greek form were pure and unadulterated by translation. Before Manutius, publishers rarely printed volumes in Greek, mainly due to the complexity of providing a standardized Greek typeface. Manutius published rare manuscripts in their original Greek and Latin forms. He commissioned the creation of typefaces in Greek and Latin resembling the humanist handwriting of his time, typefaces that are the first known precursor of italic type. As the Aldine Press grew in popularity, Manutius's innovations were quickly copied across Italy despite his efforts to prevent the piracy of Aldine editions.

Because of the Aldine Press's growing reputation for meticulous, accurate publications, Dutch philosopher Erasmus sought out Manutius to publish his translations of Iphigenia in Aulis.

In his youth, Manutius studied in Rome to become a humanist scholar. He was friends with Giovanni Pico and tutored Pico's nephews, the lords of Carpi, Alberto and Leonello Pio. While a tutor, Manutius published two works for his pupils and their mother. In his late thirties or early forties, Manutius settled in Venice to become a print publisher. He met Andrea Torresano in Venice and the two co-founded the Aldine Press.

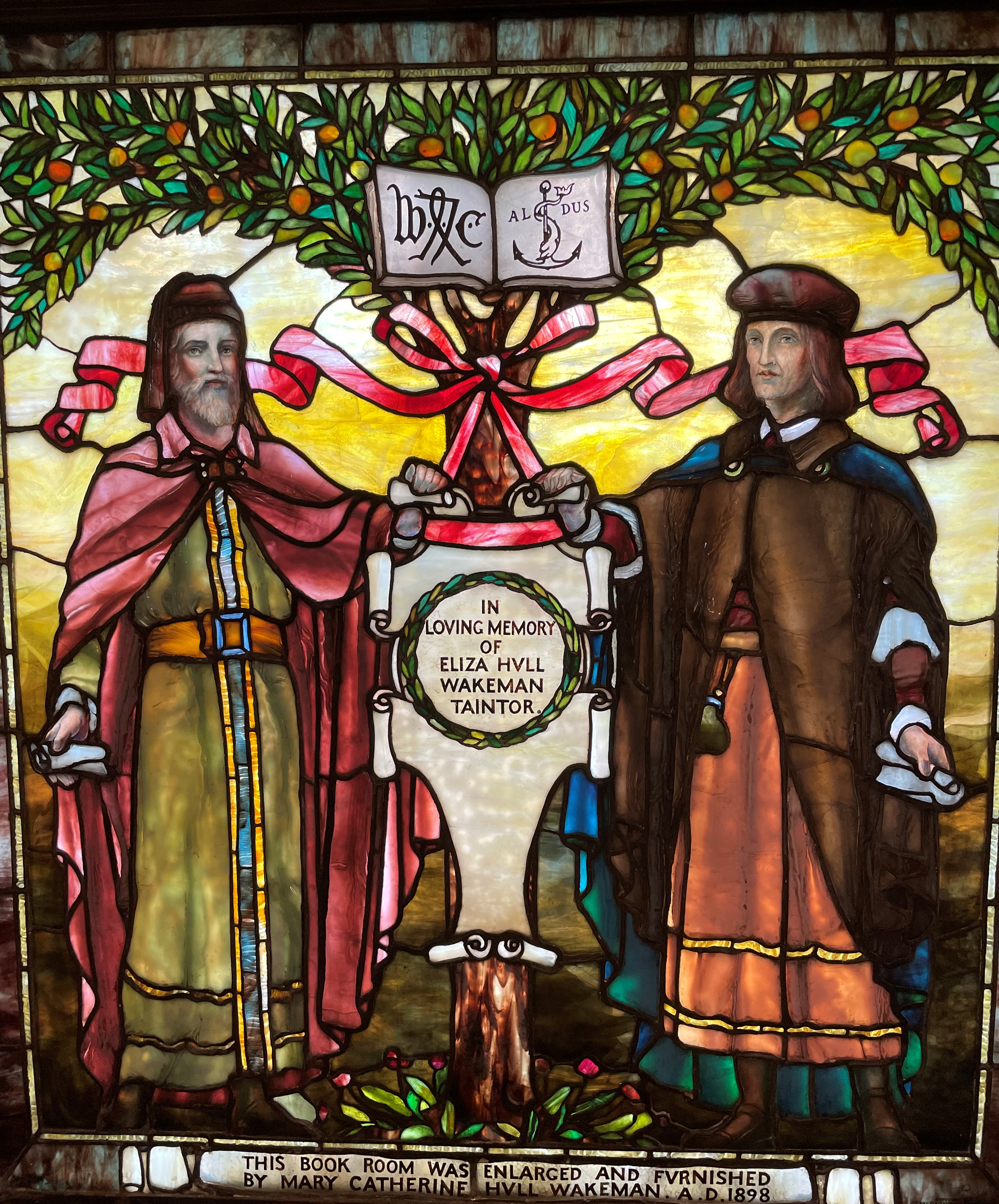
Aldus Manutius, pictured with William Caxton, at Pequot Library, Southport on Tiffany Glass panel

== Early life ==
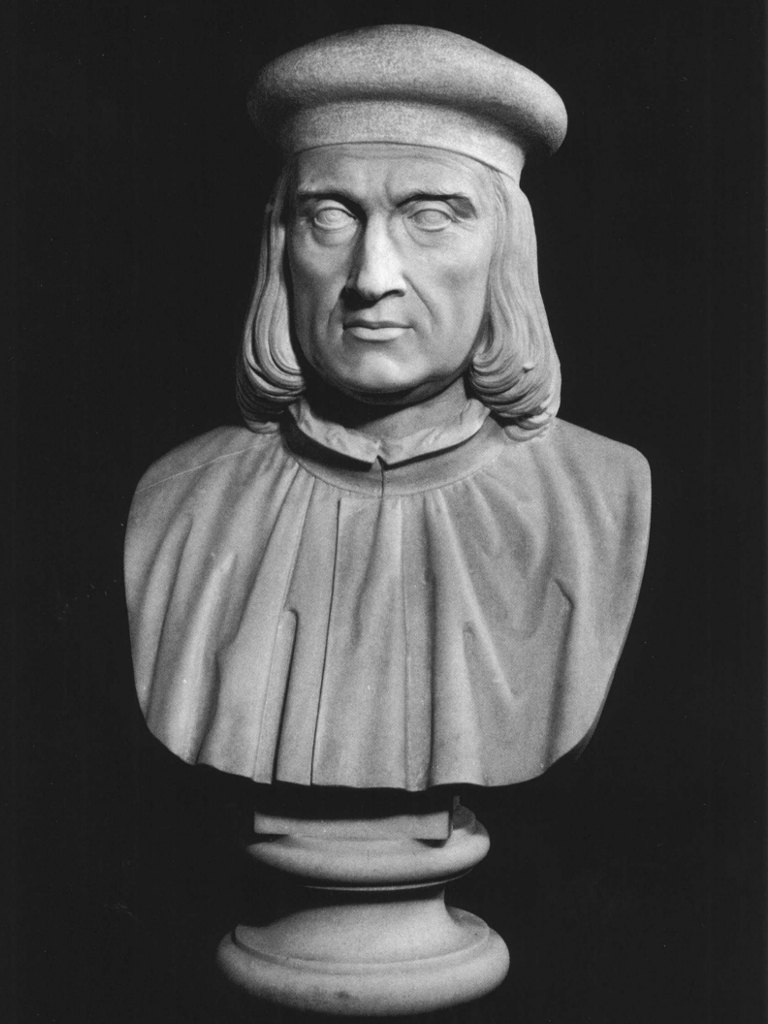
Bust of Aldo Manuzio. Panteon Veneto; Istituto Veneto di Scienze, Lettere ed Arti

Aldus Manutius was born close to Rome in Bassiano between 1449 and 1452. He grew up in a wealthy family during the Italian Renaissance and in his youth was sent to Rome to become a humanist scholar. In Rome, he studied Latin under Gaspare da Verona and attended lectures by Domizio Calderini in the early 1470s. From 1475 to 1478, Manutius studied Greek in Ferrara with Battista Guarino as his teacher.

Most of Manutius's early life is rather unknown. According to John Addington Symonds, writing in the Encyclopædia Britannica Eleventh Edition, Manutius was granted citizenship of the town of Carpi on 8 March 1480 where he owned local property, and in 1482 he travelled to Mirandola for a time with his longtime friend and fellow student, Giovanni Pico della Mirandola, where he stayed two years to study Greek literature. Pico recommended Manutius to become the tutor of his nephews, Alberto and Leonello Pio, princes of the town of Carpi. In Carpi, Manutius shared a close bond with his student, Alberto Pio. At the end of the 1480s, Manutius published two works addressed to his two pupils and their mother, Caterina Pico—both works were published in Venice by Baptista de Tortis: Musarum Panagyris with its Epistola Catherinae Piae (March/May 1487 to March 1491) and the Paraenesis (1490).

Giovanni Pico and Alberto Pio's families funded the starting costs of Manutius's printing press and gave him lands in Carpi. Manutius determined that Venice was the best location for his work, settling there in 1490. In Venice, Manutius began gathering publishing contracts, at which point he met Andrea Torresano, who was also engaged in print publishing. Torresano and Manutius became lifelong business partners, and for their first contract together Manutius hired Torresano to print the first edition of his Latin grammar book the Institutiones grammaticae, published on 9 March 1493.

== Aldine Press ==
The Aldine Press, established in 1494, had its first publication in March 1495: Erotemata cum interpretatione Latina by Constantine Lascaris. Andrea Torresano and Pier Francesco Barbarigo, nephew of the Doge, Agostino Barbarigo, each held fifty per cent of the press. From Torresano's fifty per cent, Manutius was given one-fifth, but accounts are unclear as to whether Manutius's one-fifth refers to ten per cent of the Aldine Press or ownership exclusively to one-fifth of Torresano's share.

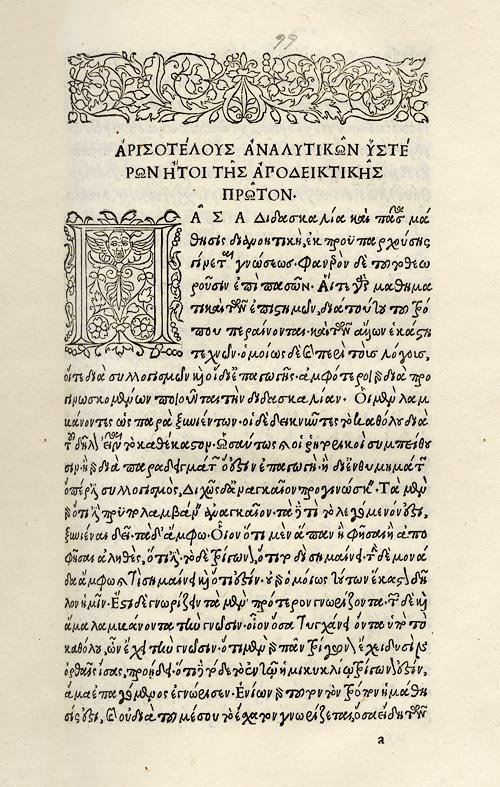
Aristotle printed by Aldus Manutius, 1495–98 (Libreria antiquaria Pregliasco, Turin); shown here is the first page of the Posterior Analytics

The press's first great achievement was a five-volume folio edition of Aristotle. Manutius started the first volume of his Aristotle edition in 1495. Four more volumes were published together in 1497 and 1498. The Aldine Press produced nine comedies of Aristophanes in 1498, and Pietro Bembo edited Petrarch's poems that Manutius published in July 1501. In addition to editing Greek manuscripts, Manutius corrected and improved texts originally published in Florence, Rome, and Milan.

The Second Italian War suspended the press for a time. During that time, Desiderius Erasmus asked Manutius to publish his translations of Hecuba and Iphigenia in Aulis through the Aldine Press. Erasmus's original letter to Manutius inquires about the printer's proposed plans: a Greek Plato and a polyglot bible. Through correspondence, the two came to an agreement. In December 1507, the Aldine Press published Iphigenia in Aulis in an 80-page octavo with Erasmus's translation from Greek into Latin. With the success and accuracy of their first collaboration, Manutius agreed to publish the expanded version of the Adagiorum collectanea Erasmus was working on. Erasmus travelled to Venice, where he spent his first ten months working at the Aldine Press. He lived in Manutius and Torresano's home, where he shared a room with Girolamo Aleandro. His research using Manutius's resources and Greek scholars enabled him to expand his collection of proverbs from 819 entries to 3,260 entries. The Aldine press published this newly expanded collection of proverbs, Adagiorum Chiliades, in 1508. After the publication of Adagiorum Chiliades, Erasmus helped Manutius proofread a Greek edition of Plutarch's Moralia along with many other Aldine Press publications.

Manutius relied on Marcus Musurus, Ioannis Grigoropoulos, and other Greek collaborators to translate for the Aldine Press. He published an edition of minor Greek orators (1508) and the lesser works of Plutarch (1509). Printing work halted again while the League of Cambrai tried to lessen Venice's influence. Manutius reappeared in 1513 with an edition of Plato that he dedicated to Pope Leo X in a preface that compares the miseries of warfare and the woes of Italy with the sublime and tranquil objects of the student's life.

With the Aldine Press's increasing popularity, people would come to visit the shop, interrupting Manutius's work. Manutius put up a sign that read, "Whoever you are, Aldus asks you again and again what it is you want from him. State your business briefly and then immediately go away."

Manutius strove for excellence in typography and book design while publishing lower-cost editions. This was carried out under continual difficulties, including problems arising from strikes among his workmen, unauthorized use of Manutius's materials by rivals, and frequent interruptions by war.

=== Greek classics ===
Before Manutius, there were fewer than ten Greek titles in print, most of which had to be imported from the Accursius Press of Milan. Only four Italian towns were authorized to produce Greek publications: Milan, Venice, Vicenza, and Florence, and they only published works by Theocritus, Isocrates, and Homer. Venetian printer John Speyer produced Greek passages but required the minimal Greek letters to be left blank and later filled in by hand.

Manutius desired to "inspire and refine his readers by inundating them with Greek." He originally came to Venice because of its many Greek resources; Venice held Greek manuscripts from the time of Constantinople and was home to a large cluster of Greek scholars who travelled there from Crete. Venice was also where Cardinal Bessarion, in 1468, donated his large Greek manuscript collection. To preserve ancient Greek literature, the Aldine Press commissioned a typeface based on classical Greek manuscripts so that readers could experience the original Greek text more authentically.

While publishing Greek manuscripts, Manutius founded the New Academy, a group of Hellenist scholars, in 1502 to promote Greek studies. Symonds writes that the New Academy's "rules were written in Greek, its members spoke Greek, their names were Hellenized, and their official titles were Greek." Members of the New Academy included Desiderius Erasmus, Pietro Bembo, and Scipio Fortiguerra. Martin Lowry, Manutius' biographer, has a different view, regarding the New Academy as a hopeful dream rather than an organized institute.

Manutius spoke Greek in his household and employed thirty Greek speakers at the Aldine Press. Greek speakers from Crete prepared and proofed manuscripts and their calligraphy was a model for the casts used for Greek type. Instructions for typesetters and binders were written in Greek, and the prefaces to Manutius's editions were also in Greek. Manutius printed editions of Hero and Leander by Musaeus Grammaticus, the Galeomyomachia, and the Greek Psalter. He called these "Precursors of the Greek Library" because they served as guides to the Greek language. Under Manutius's supervision, the Aldine Press published 75 texts by Classical Greek and Byzantine authors.

=== Latin and Italian classics ===
Along with Greek classics, the Aldine Press published Latin and Italian authors. Manutius launched Pietro Bembo's career as a writer by publishing De Aetna in 1496, which was the Aldine Press's first Latin publication by a contemporary author. The Bembo family hired the Aldine Press to produce accurate texts of Dante and Petrarch using Bernardo Bembo's personal manuscript collection. Pietro Bembo worked with Manutius from 1501 to 1502 to provide an accurate edition of Dante and Petrarch and also introduced punctuation. Bembo later made a diagram of sins to illustrate the 1515 Aldine edition of Dante.

Manutius did not hold the same power of innovation over Latin classics as with Greek classics because the publication of these works started 30 years before his time. To promote the Aldine editions in Latin, Manutius promoted the quality of his publications through his prefaces. Manutius was on the lookout for rare manuscripts, but often found instead missing parts of previously published works. Cuspinianus let Manutius publish the missing parts of Valerius Maximus's work, which Cuspinianus "had found in a manuscript in Vienna." Francesco Negri let Manutius publish the missing text of Julius Firmicus, which Negri found in Romania, and "a manuscript from Britain made an improved edition of Prudentius possible."

The press printed first editions of Poliziano's collected works, Pietro Bembo's Asolani, Francesco Colonna's Hypnerotomachia Poliphili, and Dante's Divine Comedy. The 1501 publication of Virgil introduced the use of italic print and was produced in higher-than-normal print runs (1,000 rather than the usual 200 to 500 copies).

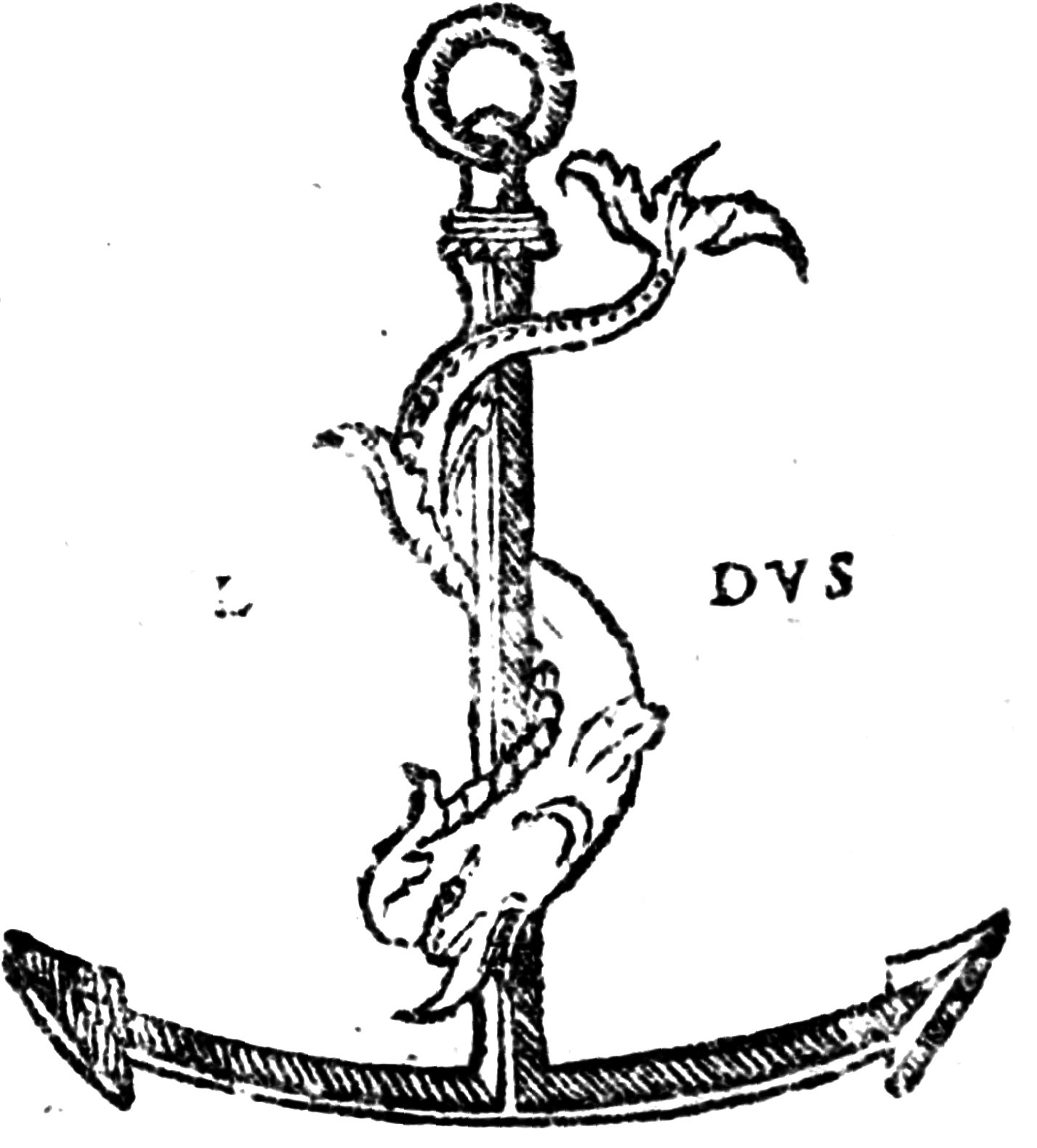
Imprint of Aldus Manutius, in Bembo, Gli Asolani

=== Imprint and motto ===
Manutius adopted the image of a dolphin wrapped around an anchor as his publisher's device in June 1502. The dolphin-and-anchor symbol is associated with the phrase festina lente, meaning "make haste slowly," indicating quickness combined with firmness in the execution of a great scheme. The symbol and phrase were taken from a Roman coin minted during Emperor Vespasian's reign that was given to Manutius by Pietro Bembo.

Manutius's editions of the classics were so highly respected that the dolphin-and-anchor device was almost immediately pirated by French and Italian publishers. Many modern organizations use the image of a dolphin wrapped around an anchor. The device has been used by the nineteenth-century London firm of William Pickering, and by Doubleday. The international honour society for library and information science, Beta Phi Mu, uses the dolphin and anchor as its insignia.

=== Enchiridia ===
Manutius described his new format of books as "libelli portatiles in formam enchiridii" ("portable small books in the form of a manual"). Enchiridion, described in A Legacy More Lasting than Bronze, also refers to a handheld weapon, a hint that Aldus intended the books in his Portable Library to be the weapons of scholars. It was for these pocket-sized classics Aldus designed the italic font.

Manutius converted to the smaller format in 1501 with the publication of Virgil. As time went on, Manutius self-advertised his portable format through the dedication pages he published.

Many scholars consider the development of the portable book as Manutius's most celebrated contribution to printing and publishing. These mobile books were the first known appearance of an editio minor, a straightforward text. During the 15th century, books were often chained to a reading platform to protect valuable property, requiring the reader to stay stationary. Publishers often added commentary to their published classics. Thus, pages became overloaded with scholarship and serious material which produced a large book that was difficult to transport. The Aldine Press removed these inconveniences; Manutius's books were "published without commentary and in smaller sizes, usually octavos of five by eight or four by six inches." His famous octavo editions are often regarded as the first prototype of the mass-market paperback.

The octavos were moderately priced considering the known average salaries of the time, but they were not cheap. Manutius priced his Latin octavos at 30 soldi, which was a fourth of a ducat. His Greek octavos were double the price at 60 soldi. For context, a master mason would earn about 50 soldi a day to make between 50 and 100 ducats a year.

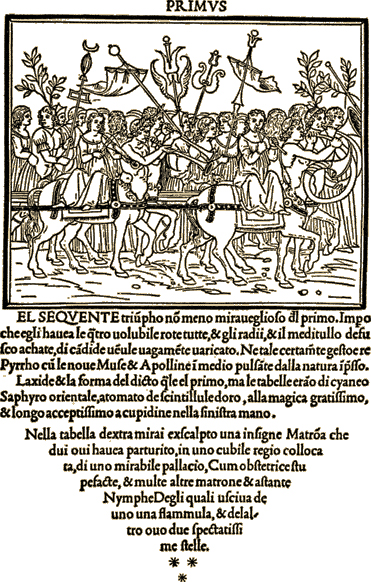
A page from Francesco Colonna's Hypnerotomachia Poliphili, an illustrated book printed by Aldus Manutius

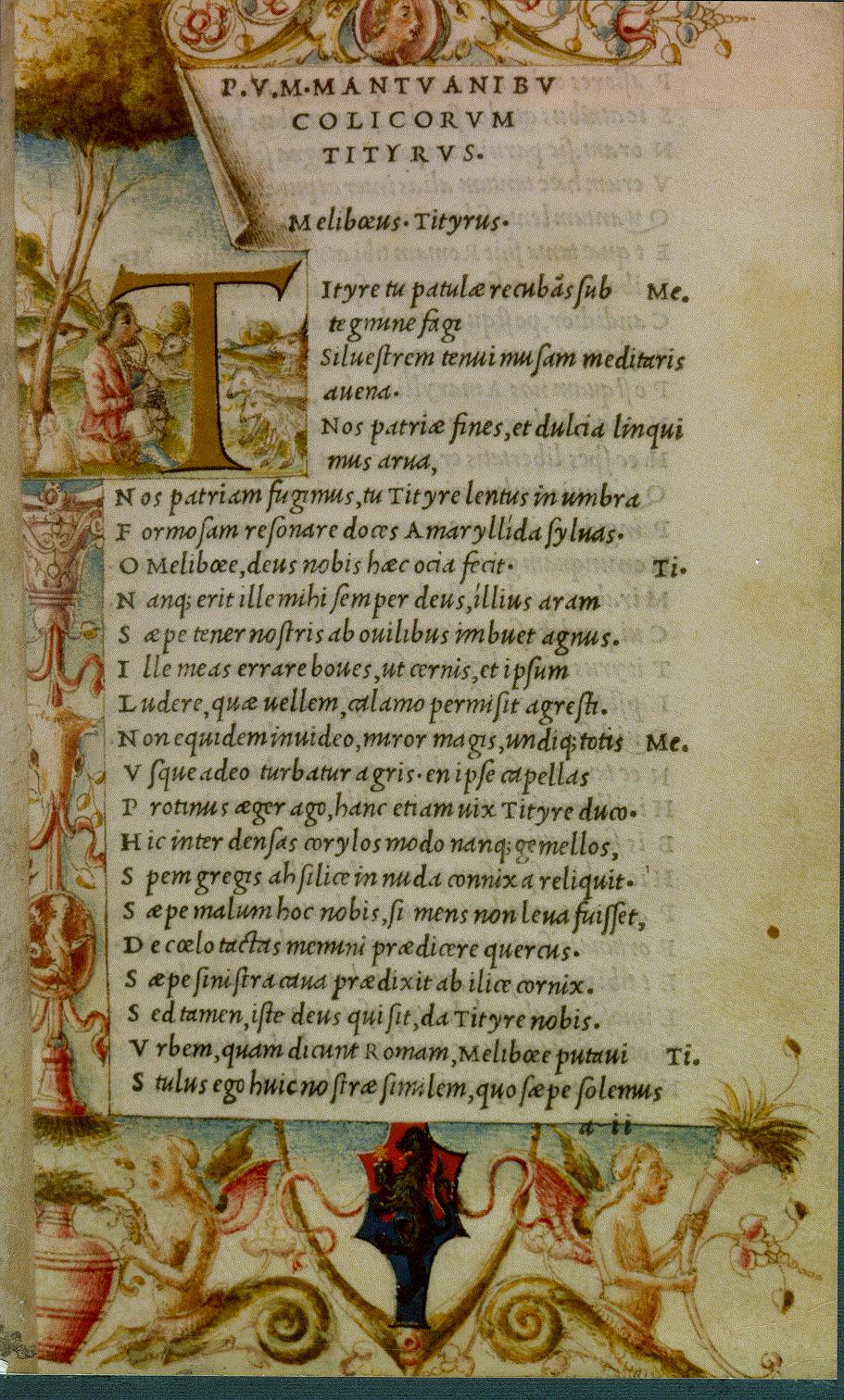
The John Rylands Library copy of the Aldine Vergil of 1501, printed on vellum and hand-coloured

=== Typefaces ===
Everyday handwriting in Venice was in cursive, but at the time, printed works imitated formal manuscript hands, either blackletter or the humanistic littera antica. Manutius commissioned typefaces designed to look like the handwriting of humanists both in Latin and Greek in order to uphold the manuscript tradition. In the New Aldine Studies, Harry George Fletcher III, Pierpont Morgan Library's curator for printed books and bindings, writes that Manutius intended "to make available in type a face comfortable for its readers" with the cursive typeface.

Manutius commissioned the punchcutter Francesco Griffo of Bologna to create the new typeface. The handwriting reproduced for the many Aldine Press typefaces is a topic of conflicting opinions by scholars; Symonds (1911) suggests Petrarch's handwriting, while the New Aldine Studies presumes the handwriting of scribes Pomponio Leto and Bartolomeo Sanvito was the inspiration for the typeface. Other scholars believe the first Greek typeface was derived from the handwriting of Immanuel Rhusotas, another scribe during the time of Manutius. The Aldine Press commissioned the first Greek script designed "with accents and letters cast separately and combined by the compositor." The typeface was first used in publishing Erotemata by Constantine Lascaris in 1495. The Roman typeface was finished later the same year and Pietro Bembo's De Aetna was the first book published in the new Roman script.

Manutius and Griffo's original typeface is the first known model of italic type and was used by Manutius until 1501. Five italic words were printed in St. Catherine of Siena in 1500, and in 1501 an Opera by Virgil was the first completed book in italic type. A falling out between Manutius and Griffo brought Griffo to leave and supply other publishers with the italic type originally commissioned by the Aldine Press. Griffo only made one set of punches for the Aldine Press, which were used until 1559. Griffo's original italic type did not include capital letters, so many of the Aldine Press publications forwent capital letters.

The 1502 publication of the Metamorphoses included Manutius's privilege from the Doge of Venice indicating that any use or imitation of Manutius's Greek and Italic typefaces was forbidden. Despite trying to have the typeface protected legally, Manutius could not stop printers outside of Venice from using his work, which led to the typeface's popularity outside of Italy.

=== Counterfeits and piracy ===
As the Aldine Press grew in popularity, Aldine counterfeits also increased. Manutius acquired privileges for his printing press from the Venetian Senate, specifically, for "his types, his pioneering octavo format, and even individual texts." Pope Alexander VI in 1502 and Pope Julius II in 1514 granted Manutius printing privileges from the papacy. This did not stop Aldine Press counterfeits, as there was little penalty for piracy at the time.

Manutius attempted to discourage piracy with blunt warnings at the end of his publications, as in Sylvarum libri quinque, by Publius Papinius Statius, where he warned "no one is allowed to print this without penalty." In the Bibliothèque du Roi on 16 March 1503, Manutius tried to warn off those who plagiarized his content, "it happens that in the city of Lyon our books appeared under my name, but full of errors ... and deceived unwary buyers due to the similarity of typography and format ... Furthermore, the paper is of poor quality and has a heavy odour, and the typography, if you examine it closely, exudes a sort of (as one might phrase it) 'Frenchiness'." He described the counterfeit's typographical errors in detail so that readers might distinguish a real Aldine from a fake. In spite of his efforts, the Lyonese printers were quick to use Manutius's critique to improve their counterfeits.

=== Illuminated manuscripts and prefaces ===
Before the printing press and during the Italian Renaissance, illuminated manuscripts were individually created by a credited artist. When print publishing became popular, woodcuts were used to mass-illuminate works. The woodcuts were often reused in several editions, thereby decreasing their value. These woodcuts soon came to Venice and were viewed as part of the "new humanist manuscript." The woodcut images "included aspects of both continuity and discontinuity that involved the activity of Manutius, who was called upon to wholly explicate the new potential of the printed book and deal with the crisis of the illumination." Many of the Aldine Press's publications contained illumination, but Manutius let patrons decide the illumination details while he worked to translate and publish.

Prefatory letters, popular in first editions of Latin works years before, were also common for Aldine editions. Manutius used the Aldine editions to ask scholarly questions and provide information for his readers. In the preface of Ovid's Metamorphoses (1502), he argues that Heroides 17, 19, and 21 (the letters of Helen, Hero, and Cudippe, respectively) were the work of the poet Sabinus, whom Ovid refers to as Amores. In another preface Manutius explains how a sundial works.

== Personal life ==
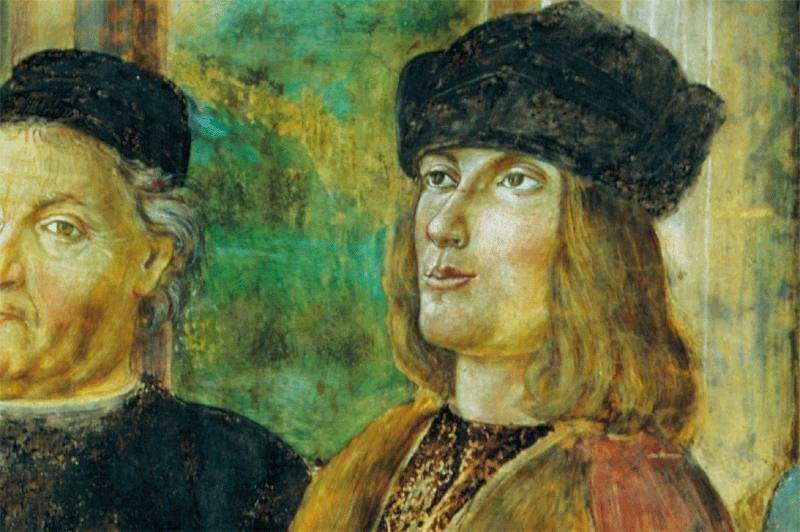
Aldo Manuzio (left) and Alberto III Pio by Bernardino Loschi

In 1505, Manutius married Maria, the daughter of Andrea Torresani (or Torresano) of Asola. Torresani and Manutius were already business partners, but the marriage combined the two partners' shares in the publishing business. After the marriage, Manutius lived at Torresani's house. Shrinking in popularity, in 1506 the Aldine Press was moved to a house now covered by a bank building in the Venice square, Campo Manin.

In March 1506, Manutius decided to travel for six months in search of new and reliable manuscripts. While travelling with a guide, Manutius was stopped by border guards of the Marquisate of Mantua who were looking for two criminals. Manutius's guide ran in fear, taking with him all of Manutius's personal effects. This suspicious activity led the guards to arrest Manutius. Manutius knew the Marquis of Mantua, Francesco Gonzaga, and wrote letters to him to explain the situation, but it took six days until Manutius's imprisonment was brought to Gonzaga's attention. While waiting, Manutius spent five days in jail in Casal Romano and another night in Canneto. He was eventually released by Geoffroy Carles, president of the Milanese Senate. A new, improved edition of Horace (after 30 March 1509) with an accompanying work by Manutius on Horatian metrics dedicated to Carles was contingent on this experience and Manutius's connection with Carles.

Manutius wrote his will on 16 January 1515 instructing Giulio Campagnola to provide capital letters for the Aldine Press's italic type. He died the next month, 6 February, and "with his death, the importance of Italy as a seminal and dynamic force in printing came to an end." Torresani and his two sons carried on the business during the youth of Manutius's children, and eventually Paulus, Manutius's son, born 1512, took over the business. Paulus won a lawsuit against his Torresani relatives for sole ownership of Manutius's italic typeface and in 1539 led the press with the Sons of Aldus imprint alongside his brothers until his death in 1574. The publishing symbol and motto were never wholly abandoned by the Aldine Press until the expiration of their firm in its third generation of operation by Aldus Manutius the Younger.

Manutius dreamed of a trilingual Bible but never saw it come to fruition. However, before his death Manutius had begun an edition of the Septuagint, also known as the Greek Old Testament translated from Hebrew, the first-ever to be published; it appeared posthumously in 1518.

== Modern influence ==
1994 marked the 500th anniversary of Aldus Manutius's first publication. On Manutius, Paul F. Grendler wrote, "Aldus ensured the survival of a large number of ancient texts and greatly facilitated the diffusion of the values, enthusiasms, and scholarship of Italian Renaissance Humanism to the rest of Europe". "He jettisoned commentary because he felt that it prevented the dialogue between author and reader that the Renaissance prized."

=== Legacy ===
The Aldine Press produced more than 100 editions from 1495 to 1505. The majority were Greek classics, but many notable Latin and Italian works were published as well. Aldus often produced small-format editions that were cheap and sold readily. These inexpensive books—the first paperbacks—were, as ever, a boon to scholars.

Erasmus was impressed by Manutius; "in a long passage he extols the 'tireless efforts' of Manutius in restoring ancient learning, truly 'a Herculean task,' and he announces that 'Aldus is building up a library which has no other limits than the world itself'."

The Palazzo dei Pio chapel in Carpi has a painted mural that includes Aldus Manutius along with Alberto and Leonello Pio. In Bassiano, Manutius's birthplace, a monument was erected to commemorate the 450th year since Manutius's death. The inscription is Manutius's own words: "for the abundance of good books which, we hope, will finally put to flight all ignorance."

The quality and popularity of Manutius's work made it more expensive in the 20th century than others published around the same time. In 1991, Martin Lowry found that an auction in New York took place where "initial prices of $6,000–$8,000 and $8,000–$12,000 were quotes on copies of Decor Puellarum and Aulus Gellius in Jenson's editions: Aldus' Hypnerotomachia Polifili started at $25,000–$30,000."

=== In popular culture ===
- Manutius's name is the inspiration for Progetto Manuzio, an Italian free text project similar to Project Gutenberg.
- A typeface created by Hermann Zapf was named after Aldus Manutius and dedicated to his memory.
- The novel Mr. Penumbra's 24-Hour Bookstore by Robin Sloan features a fictionalized version of Aldus Manutius, as well as a fictional secret society devoted to him. One of the novel's characters, Griffo Gerritszoon, designs a fictitious font called "Gerritszoon" that is preinstalled on every Mac, in allusion to Manutius's associate Francesco Griffo, the designer of italic type. The Aldine Press' motto festina lente is used as the name of the fictional corporation that owns and markets the "Gerritszoon" font.
- The Aldus Corporation, a software company founded in Seattle in 1985 known for PageMaker and FreeHand, was named after Manutius and used his profile as part of their company logo. Aldus was purchased by Adobe Systems in 1994.
- The Aldus Journal of Translation, a publication from Brown University, is named after Aldus Manutius.
- The book John Henry Nash: The Aldus of San Francisco relates John Nash to Aldus Manutius and San Francisco to Venice.
- "Manuzio" ("Manutius" in the English translation) is the name of a vanity publisher in Umberto Eco's 1988 novel Foucault's Pendulum.
- Anne Carson referenced Manutius while meditating on the poetic connotations of the semicolon in her Northrop Frye lecture on "Stillness" at the University of Toronto's The Centre for Comparative Literature.

== Publications ==
A partial list of works translated and published by the Aldine Press under Manutius's supervision.

=== Greek editions ===
Greek editions published during Manutius's lifetime:

- Galeomyomachia, c. 1494–1495
- Hero and Leander, Musaeus, c. 1495
- Psalter, c. 1497
- Rules of the New Academy, c. 1501
- Epitome of the Eight Parts of Speech, Lascaris, 1495
- Organon, Aristotle, 1495
- Grammar, Theodorus Gaza, 1495
- Idylls, Theocritus, 1495–1496
- Thesaurus, Corn of Amalthea and Gardens of Adones, 1496
- Historia Plantarum, Theophrastus, 1497
- Dictionarium Graecum, I. Crastonus, 1497
- Hours of the Virgin, 1497
- Institutiones Graecae Grammatices, U. Bolzanius, 1497/1498
- Physics, Aristotle, 1497
- History of animals, Aristotle, 1497
- Prolegomena to the Deipnosophists, Athenaeus, 1498
- Nicomachean Ethics, Aristotle, 1498
- Nine Comedies, Aristophanes, 1498
- Catalogues of Aldus's editions
- Epistolae diversorum philosophorum oratorum ..., 1499
- De materia medica, Dioscorides, 1499
- Phaenomena, Aratus, 1499
- Metabole [Paraphrase of John], Nonnus of Panopolis, 1501
- Bibbia, 1501
- Poetae Christiani Veteres, first volume, 1501
- Poetae Christiani Veteres, second volume, 1502
- De octo partibus orationis, Constantine Lascaris, 1501–1503
- De urbibus, Stephanus Byzantius, 1502
- Onomasticon, Julius Pollux, 1502
- History of the Peloponnesian War, Thucydides, 1502
- Tragedies, Sophocles, 1502
- Historiarum libri novem, Herodotus, 1502
- Tragoediae septendecim, Euripides, 1503
- Complete works, Lucian, 1503
- De interpretatione, Ammonius Hermiae, 1503
- Prolegomena, Ulpian, 1503
- Paralipomena, Xenophon, 1503
- Anthology of Epigrams, M. Planudes, 1503
- Commentary on Aristotle's Posterior Analytics, Ioannes Grammaticus (Philoponus), 1504
- Life of Apollonius of Tyana, Flavius Philostratus, 1504
- Carmina ad bene ..., Gregorius Nazianzenus, 1504
- Homer, 1504
- Orations, Demosthenes, 1504
- Horae in Laudem ..., 1504
- Posthomerica, Quintus Smyrnaeus, 1504–1505
- Aesop, 1505
- Adagiorum, Erasmus, 1508
- Greek Orators (2 volumes), 1508–1509
- Opuscula, Plutarch, 1509
- Erotemata, M. Chrysoloras, 1512
- Epitome, C. lascaris, 1512
- Pindar, 1513
- Orators' Speeches, 1513
- Greek Orators, 1513
- Complete works, Plato, 1513
- Commentary On the Topics of Aristotle, Alexander of Aphrodisias, 1513/1514
- Suda, 1514
- Lexikon, Hesychius, 1514
- Deipnosophists, Athenaeus, 1514
- Grammar, Aldus Manutius, 1515

=== Latin classics ===
Partial list of Latin editions published during his lifetime:

- Astronomica, Julius Firmicus, October 1499. & Astronomica, Manilius (October 1499)
- Lucretius (December 1500)
- Christian Poets, Volume 1, Prudentius, Prosper, John of Damascus (January 1501)
- Vergil (April 1501)
- Horace (May 1501)
- Juvenal & Persius (August 1501)
- Martial (December 1501)
- Catullus, Tibullus, Propertius (January 1502)
- Letter to Friends, Cicero (April 1502)
- Lucan (April 1502)
- Christian Poets, Volume 2, Sedulius, Iuvencus, Arator (June 1502)
- Statius (August 1502)
- Valerius Maximus (October 1502)
- Metamorphoses, Ovid (October 1502)
- Heroides, Amores, Ars amandi, Remedia amoris, etc., Ovid (December 1502)
- Fasti, Tristia, Ex Ponto, Ovid (February 1503)
- Homilies, Origen (after 4 April 1503)
- Vergil (December 1505)
- Letters, Pliny the Younger (November 1508)
- Horace (after 30 March 1509)
- Sallust (April 1509)
- Letters to Atticus, Brutus and his brother Quintus, Cicero (June 1513)
- On the Meaning of Archaic Words, Festus (June 1513)
- Julius Caesar (December 1513)
- Rhetorical Works, Cicero (March 1514)
- On Agriculture, Cato, Varro, Columella, Palladius (May 1514)
- Quintilian (August 1514)
- Vergil (October 1514)
- Lucretius (January 1515)

=== Humanist works ===
Partial list of Humanist authors translated and published by the Aldine Press under Manutius's supervision:

- Instructional Principles of Latin Grammar, Aldus Manutius (5 March 1493)
- Gleanings in Dialectics, Lorenzo Maioli (July 1497)
- Complete Works, Angelo Poliziano (July 1498)
- Cornucopiae, Niccolò Perotti (July 1499)
- Rudiments of Latin Grammar, Aldus Manutius (February–June 1501)
- On Imagination, Gianfrancesco Pico (April 1501)
- The Land and Customs of the Zygians call Circassians, Giorgio Interiano (October 1502)
- Urania, Meteora, The Gardens of the Hesperides, etc., Giovanni Pontano (May–August 1505)
- On Hunting, Adriano Castellesi (September 1505)
- Adages or Adagiorum Chiliades, Desiderius Erasmus Roterodamus (September 1508)
- Poems, Tito and Ercole Strozzi (January 1513)
- Arcadia, Jacopo Sannazaro (September 1514)
