= Seega =

Seega may refer to:

- Seega (game), board game from Egypt
- Seega (Thuringia), village in Thuringia

== See also ==
- Sega (disambiguation)
  - Sega, Japanese video game compmany
