= Mutinensis gr. 122 =

15th-century codex written in Greek

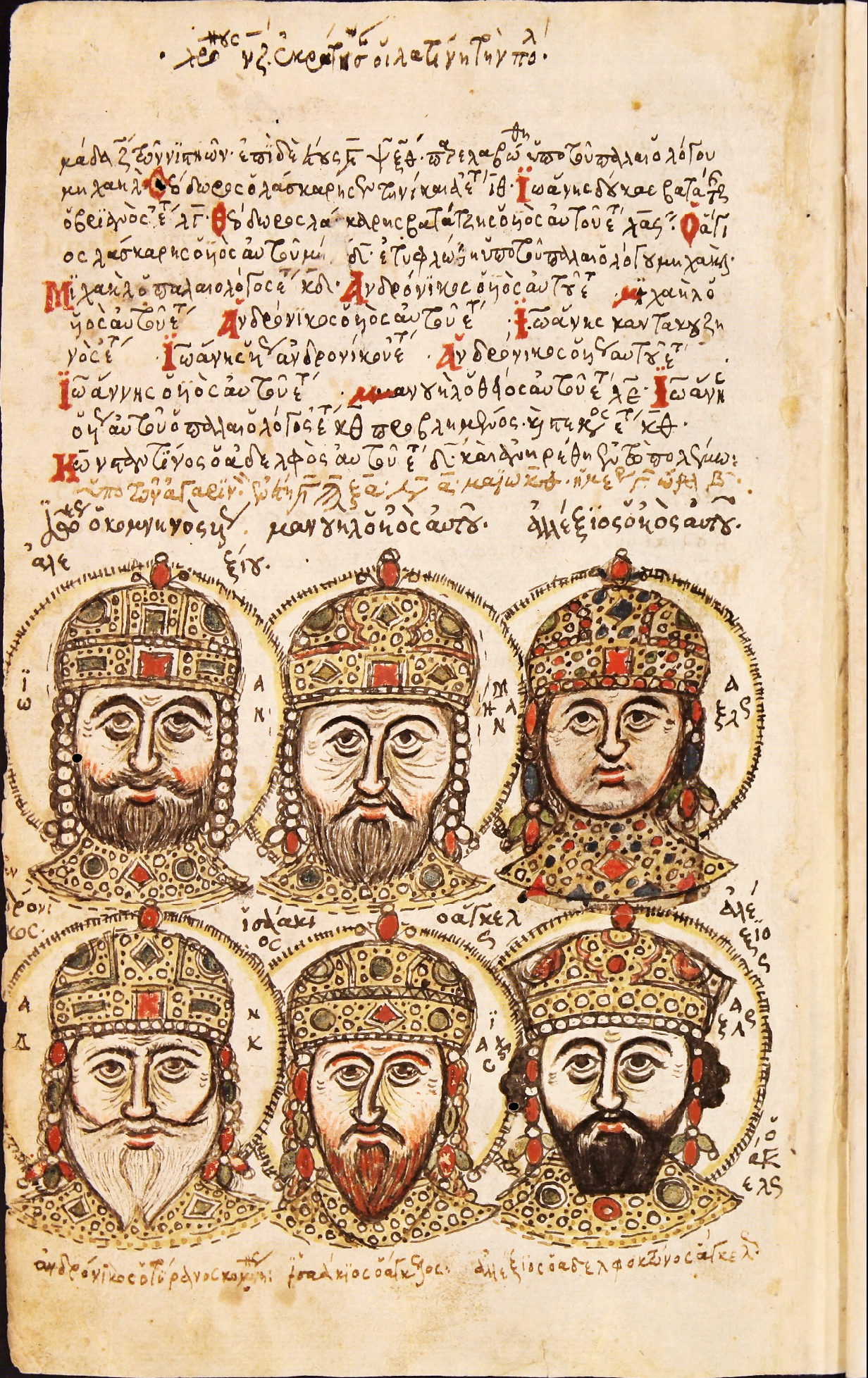
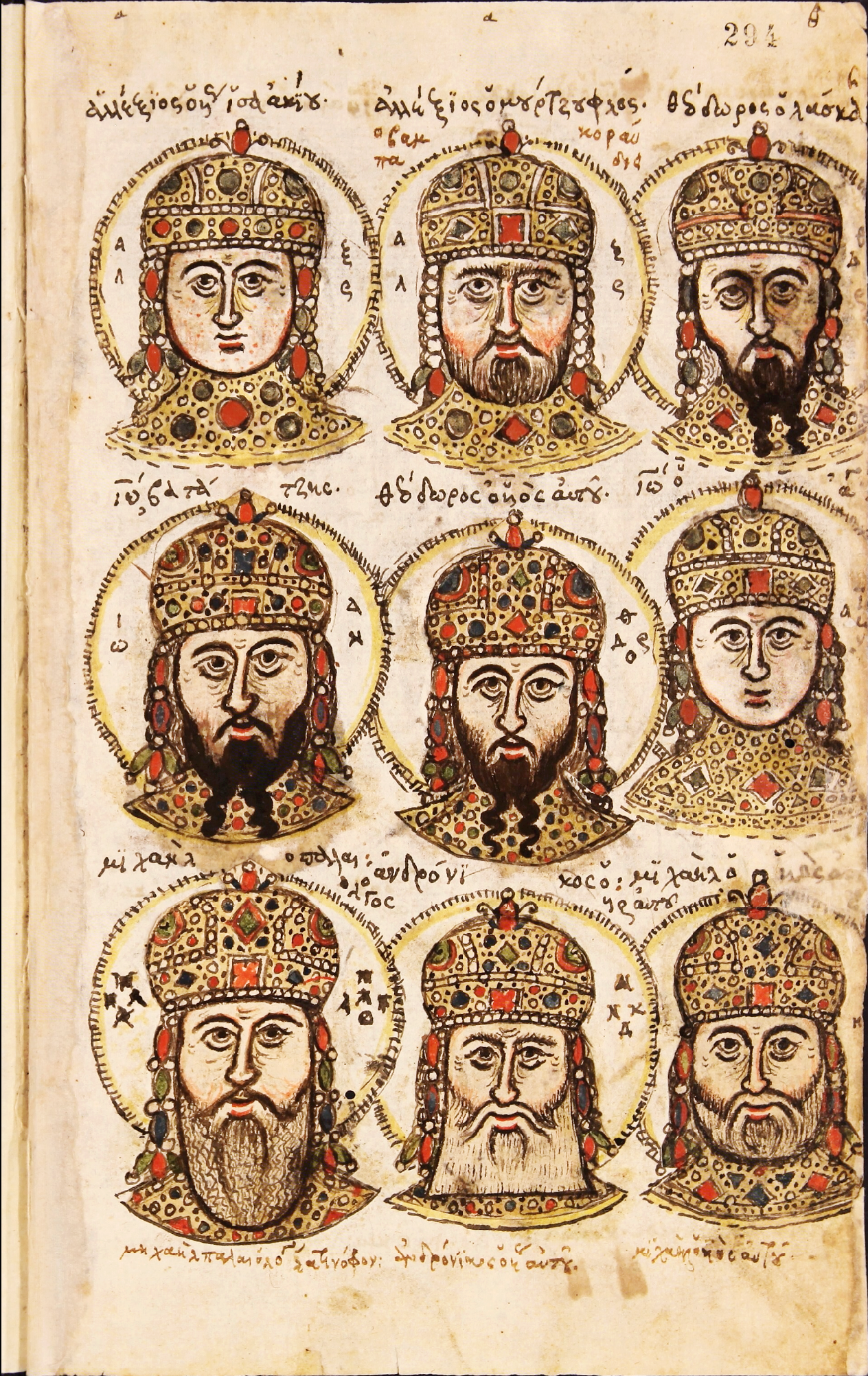
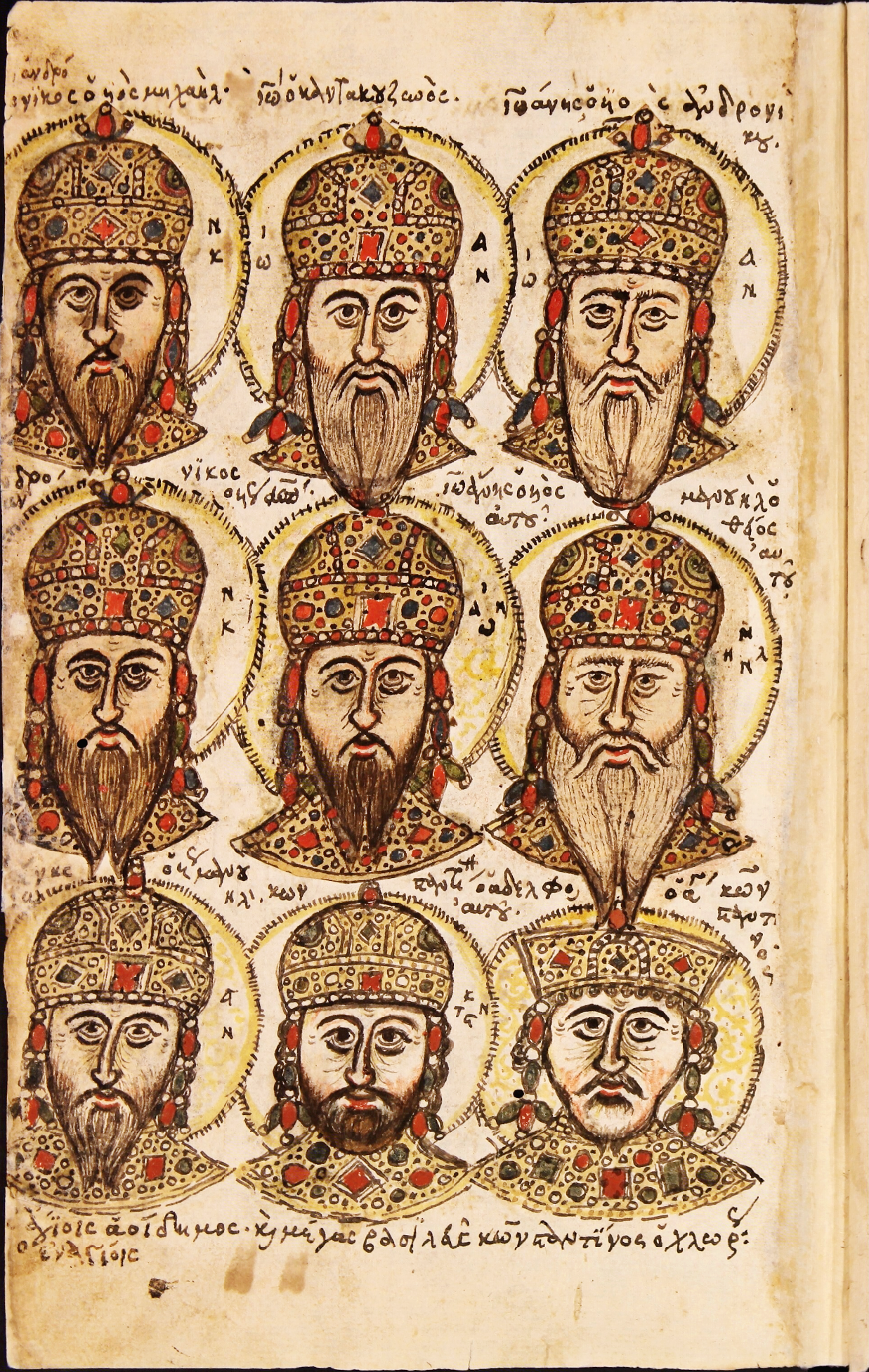
Folios 293v, 294r and 294v of Mutinensis gr. 122, featuring portraits of emperors from John II Komnenos to Constantine XI Palaiologos. Constantine XI's portrait is followed by a final portrait which depicts Constantine the Great.

Codex Mutinensis graecus 122 (Note: The codex is sometimes given the alternate designation codex Mutinensis A. S. 5.5 and it was previously known under the designation codex Mutinensis III D, S 14.) is a 15th-century codex written in Greek, today stored in the Biblioteca Estense in Modena, Italy. The designation Mutinensis gr. 122 is modern and the codex itself bears the title Epitome of Histories (Greek: Ἐπιτομὴ Ἱστοριῶν) as the bulk of its content is made up of a copy of large parts of the 12th-century Byzantine historian Joannes Zonaras's Epitome of Histories.

In addition to Zonaras's work (a chronicle of the history of the Roman Empire from its foundation to the end of the reign of the Byzantine emperor Alexios I Komnenos in the early 12th century), (Note: Zonaras's work is a world history beginning with the creation of the universe. Mutinensis gr. 122 omits the early books of Zonaras's history and begins with his account of the reign of Cleopatra.) the codex also features an original introduction, content extending it to cover history up until the Fall of Constantinople in 1453, as well as various shorter lists and accounts, for instance pertaining to court officials, church officials and imperial tombs. The codex was first created c. 1425 as a copy of Zonaras's work, and then expanded, with the new content added, by a second scribe working at some point after 1453. It is possible that the Fall of Constantinople was the event that motivated the second scribe to preserve and expand the work, as an effort to preserve the memory of the lost empire.

The most notable feature of the codex are the portraits featured throughout the manuscript. Mutinensis gr. 122 contains miniature portraits of nearly every Roman emperor from Augustus in 27 BC to Constantine XI Palaiologos in 1453 and is the only preserved manuscript to do so. While portraits of early emperors are likely to be entirely imaginary, portraits of emperors from the 7th century onwards are more reliable (though not naturalistic) and accord well with other sources depicting the same emperors, probably being based on surviving contemporary portraits, descriptions and coins. Some emperors, such as Michael IX Palaiologos (r. 1294–1320) and Andronikos IV Palaiologos (r. 1376–1379) have no known surviving portraits outside of the codex. Throughout the text containing Zonaras's historical account, the portraits are placed on the margins next to where the respective emperors are first mentioned as taking power in the text, serving as visual markings of transitions of power. The portraits of emperors after Alexios I Komnenos, who are not mentioned in Zonaras's 12th-century work, are grouped together in their own section near the end of the manuscript.

== Content and composition ==
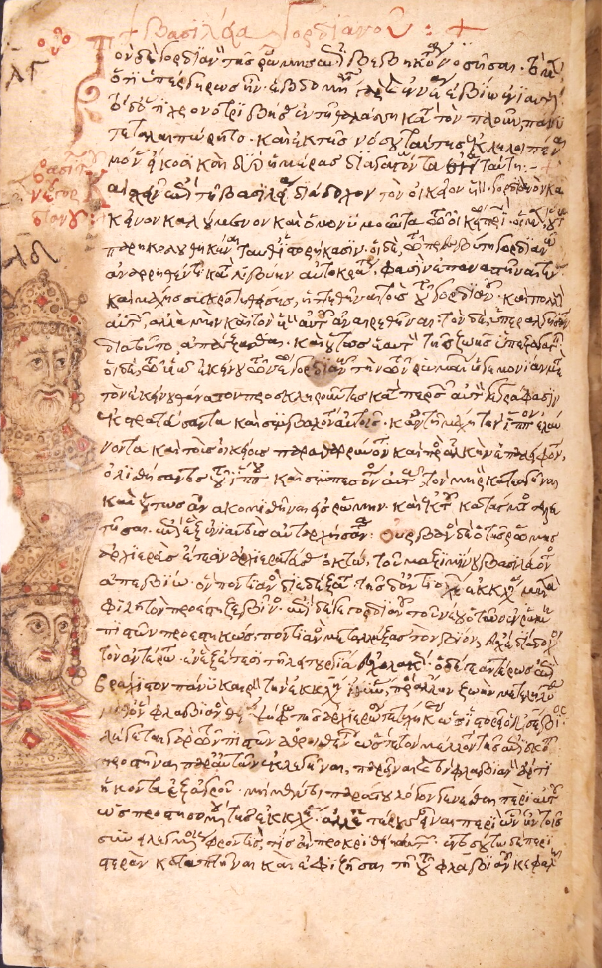
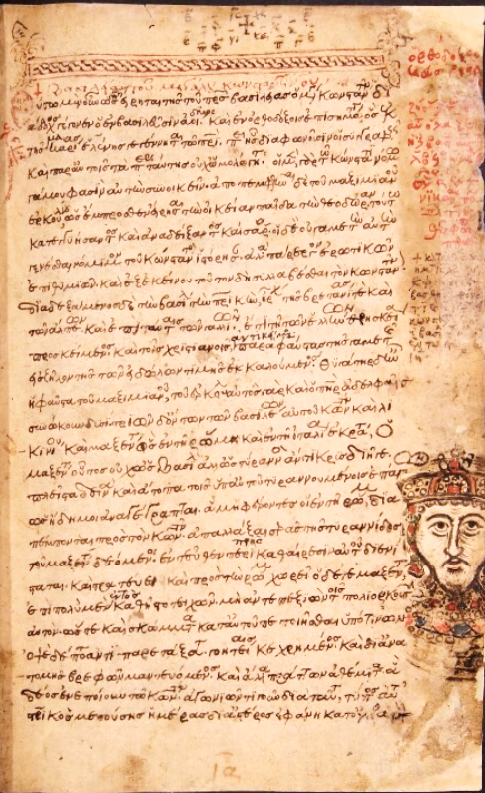
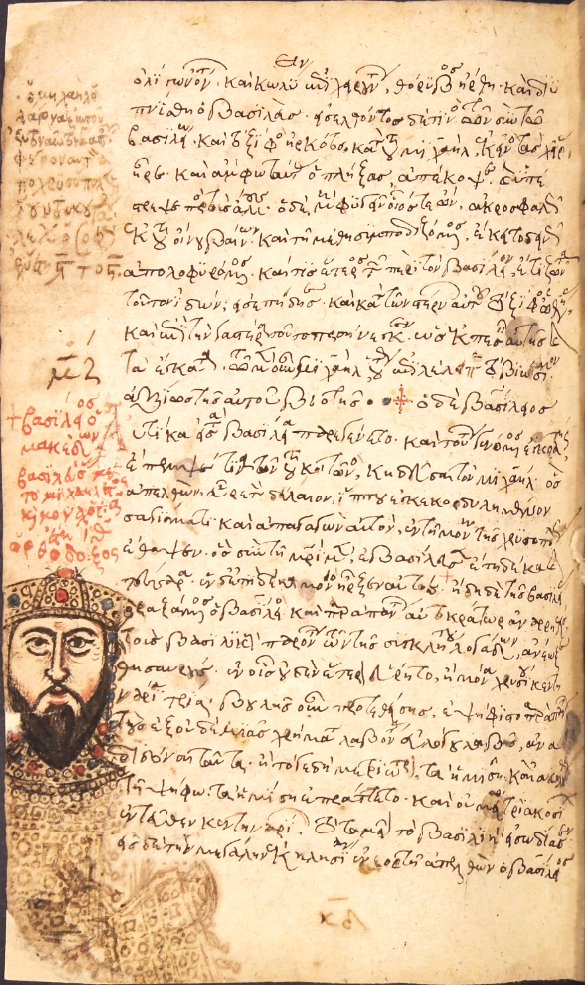
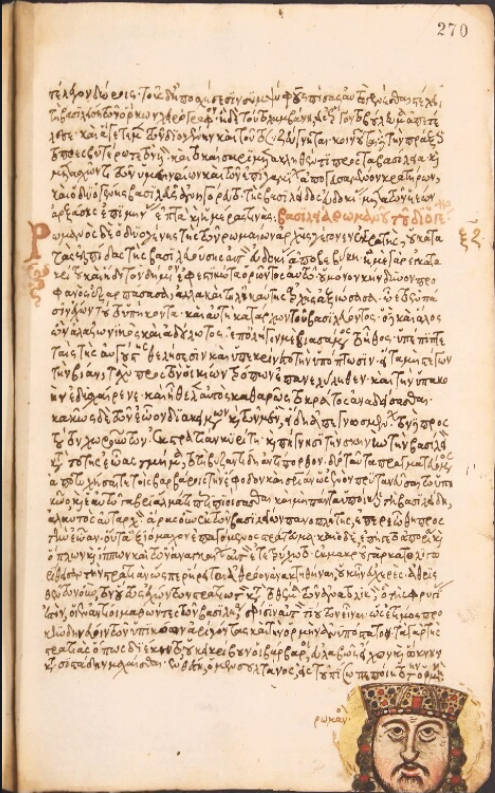
Selection of folios of Mutinensis gr. 122 (59v, 74r, 184v and 270r), featuring the portraits of Gordian I and Gordian II, Constantine the Great, Basil I, and Romanos IV Diogenes, respectively. Imperial portraits of the manuscript from Augustus to Alexios I Komnenos are included in the margins of the text.

Mutinensis gr. 122 is a 15th-century paper codex consisting of 295 folios (leaves) that measure 16 × 25 centimeters in size. The bulk of the codex is a copy of the Epitome of Histories by the 12th-century Byzantine court official and historian Joannes Zonaras, a chronicle of world history focusing on the Roman and subsequent Byzantine Empire up until the accession of Emperor John II Komnenos in 1118. Mutinensis gr. 122 does not contain Zonaras's full work, omitting the earliest books of Zonaras and instead beginning with the tenth book, which recounts the story of Cleopatra. Zonaras's work covers folios 6r to 285 of Mutinensis gr. 122. (Note: Folios consist of two pages, with the notations r ("recto"; right) and v ("verso"; left) serving to distinguish them.)

The most notable feature of Mutinensis gr. 122 is the portraits featured throughout. On the margins of folios 6 to 285, there are portraits depicting nearly every Roman and Byzantine emperor from Augustus in 27 BC to Alexios I Komnenos in 1118, followed by a section afterwards containing the portraits of the remaining emperors up to Constantine XI Palaiologos in 1453. It is the only surviving manuscript to provide portraits of all the Byzantine emperors. For a handful of emperors, including Michael IX Palaiologos (r. 1294–1320) and Andronikos IV Palaiologos (r. 1376–1379), no known surviving portraits are known from any other sources. The portraits in the text margins (up until Alexios I) are placed near where they are first mentioned as taking power in Zonaras's text, thus serving to visually mark transitions of power.

Whereas the portraits of the later (Byzantine) emperors are very standardized in that they are all forward-facing, the portraits of the earlier (Roman) emperors vary considerably in poses and in the way they face. The differences in poses and direction is probably attributable to the different source material available to the scribes from the different periods. The forward-facing and distant, motionless appearance of the later emperors reflects official imperial portraiture.

Preceding Zonaras's history is a short introduction, covering folios 2r to 5r and consisting of a brief summary of history from the beginning of the world (following the Biblical story of Genesis) to the fall of Constantinople, under the title "In the beginning God created the heaven and the earth" up to Constantine Palaiologos. After the end of Zonaras's history, the codex contains some blank folios before resuming on folio 289 with various lists. In sequential order, these lists include a list of Byzantine court offices (folio 289v), a list of patriarchs of Constantinople from Metrophanes (306–314) to Gregory III (1443–1451) (folios 290v to 290r), a list of Metropolitan sees of the patriarchate of Constantinople, in hierarchical order (folios 290r to 291r), a list of imperial tombs (folios 291r to 292r) and a list of emperors from Constantine the Great (r. 306–337) onwards (folios 292v to 293v). The codex ends with a description of an equestrian (riding) statue of Justinian I (r. 527–565) in the Augustaion in Constantinople, covering folio 295.

In the final section of portraits, the portrait of Constantine XI Palaiologos is followed by an additional final portrait, depicting Constantine the Great (the third portrait of Constantine the Great in the codex, given that he is also depicted on both folio 74r and 74v). The repetition of Constantine the Great's portrait at the end conveys a prophetic and apocalyptic message, perhaps following the sentiment of Gennadius Scholarius (the patriarch of Constantinople in the immediate aftermath of the city's fall), who believed the coincidence of the first and last emperor in Constantinople having the name Constantine meant that the end of the world was near. The repetition at the very least illustrates the belief that the beginning and the end of the imperial line were indelibly linked.

== History ==
=== Creation ===
It has traditionally been assumed that the codex is the work of two different scribes, (Note: An alternative interpretation of the creation of the codex, challenging the traditional view of two scribes, was forwarded by Olga Gratziou in 1997. She claimed that the codex was not illustrated at all originally, and that all the portraits contained within it, including both the portraits in the margins of the text and the portraits at the end, regardless of the different methods used to add them to the manuscript, were done by the same hand. Gratziou theorized that given that all portraits must then have postdated the Fall of Constantinople, and might have been created gradually by the first "post-Byzantine" owner of the book, who repaired the work and added brief historical records to update it to reflect events since original manuscript's end. Gratziou further claimed that later owners of the book then continued in a similar manner, adding notes at different points, retouching portraits and repairing damages, with the manuscript ending up being used as something akin to a "historical notebook".) with the codex beginning as a simple copy of the work of Zonaras c. 1425. No dates are known for certain but c. 1425 can be assumed since the last portrait drawn by the earlier scribe appears to be that of Manuel II Palaiologos (r. 1391–1425), which depicts him as an old man. The first scribe copied Zonaras's work, but not completely, so the second scribe later completed the addition of the end of Zonaras's history, extending it to folio 285 (it previously having stopped at folio 263r). The work of the two different scribes can be distinguished by the later work being written on paper of a different texture and bearing a watermark depicting two scissors.

The second scribe worked during the second half of the 15th century, at some point after the Fall of Constantinople in 1453, and is responsible for writing the introduction (given that a note in its margins mentions the "capture of the city") as well as for expanding the work to cover history after the 12th century. The work of the two different scribes can be distinguished by the later work being written on paper of a different texture and bearing a watermark depicting two scissors. The various lists inserted at the end of the work, and the account of the statue of Justinian I, were created and added by the second scribe.

Perhaps the Fall of Constantinople was the reason for the second scribe to preserve and extend the work, doing so as an effort to preserve the memory of the lost empire. The second scribe must have felt that it was important to complete the list and accounts of the emperors and also restored and edited portraits in earlier sections of the manuscript, in addition to creating portraits of the last few emperors. As some portraits, such as the portrait of Claudius (r. 41–54), are uncolored and others are colored in with watercolor, it is likely that the portraits in earlier sections of the work were originally without color, later colored in by the second scribe. The second scribe also wrote over annotations which had faded and added inscriptions beneath some of the portraits in red. It is clear that the later scribe rearranged parts of the codex. The early and final parts of the earlier scribe's work appear to have been in poor condition, apparently damaged by fire, before the second scribe took to restoring and adding to the codex. The later scribe thus kept the main body of the older codex, restoring some parts (such as the faded portraits), restored some of the lost text and added new text of his own. One of the key pieces of evidence that the codex was not only restored but also rearranged is that some of the portraits presented in the later sections of the work, such as those of emperors Isaac II Angelos (r. 1185–1195, 1203–1204) and John IV Laskaris (r. 1258–1261), appear to have been cut out of earlier portions of the text and pasted in later parts.

=== Ownership and research history ===
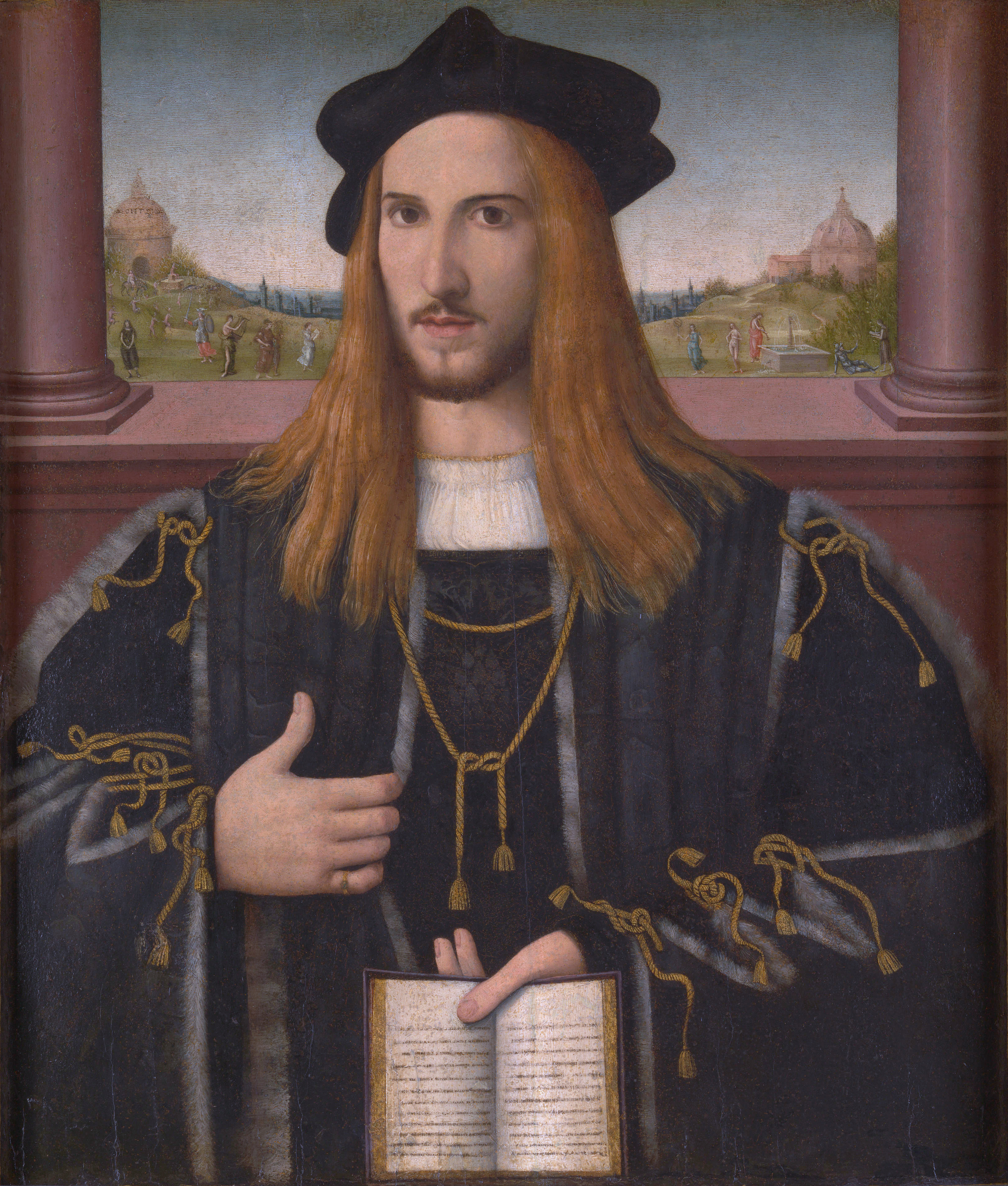
Alberto III Pio (1475–1531), one of the early post-Byzantine owners of the codex

The early ownership history of the codex is unclear. One of its early owners was a man called "Arsenius", perhaps the same person as Arsenius Apostolius, who later served as bishop of Monemvasia in Greece 1506–1509. At some point it came into possession of Giorgio Valla (1447–1500), a Venetian academic, and some time later, it was in the possession of the Renaissance nobleman Alberto III Pio (1475–1531). It was acquired by the Biblioteca Estense in Modena in 1573, and remains there to this day. It is one of more than 250 Greek/Byzantine manuscripts in the library. The manuscript today is missing its front fly-leaves. On its first page are signatures of both Valla and Pio, as well as a partial Latin inscription reading iste liber est mei– ("this book is [mine]").

The first modern study of the codex was conducted in 1892 by Karl Krumbacher, who erroneously dated the main body of the work to the 14th century, and the later additions to the 15th century. Spyridon Lambros viewed the manuscript in 1903 and, impressed by the imperial portraits, presented it with much enthusiasm at the first International Archaeological Conference, held in Athens in 1905. The only known record of such a complete sequence of imperial depictions, the codex filled what had previously been a gap in knowledge for Byzantinists.

The codex became well known among Byzantine scholars after the 1930 publication of Lambros' book Λεύκωμα Βυζαντινῶν Αὐτοκρατόρων ("Album of Byzantine emperors"), which contained portraits of all emperors and heavily relied on the Modena manuscript. Ioannis Spatharakis published the first in-depth and detailed study of the portraits, among analysis of other Byzantine portraits, in his 1976 book The Portrait in Byzantine Illuminated Manuscripts. The vast majority of modern scholarly attention towards the manuscript has been devoted to the portraits, with little research or interest given to the accompanying text. The portraits of the Byzantine emperors have also been granted more attention than the portraits of the earlier Roman emperors, given that the portraits of the ancient rulers appear to be entirely imaginary depictions.

Since the publication and circulation of the portraits in the early 20th century, they have also become influential as images of the emperors. In 1982, a postage stamp was issued on Cyprus commemorating the liberation of the island by emperor Nikephoros II Phokas (r. 963–969), 1017 years earlier. The portrait of Nikephoros featured on the stamp was a modified version of his portrait in the codex.

== Analysis of the portraits ==
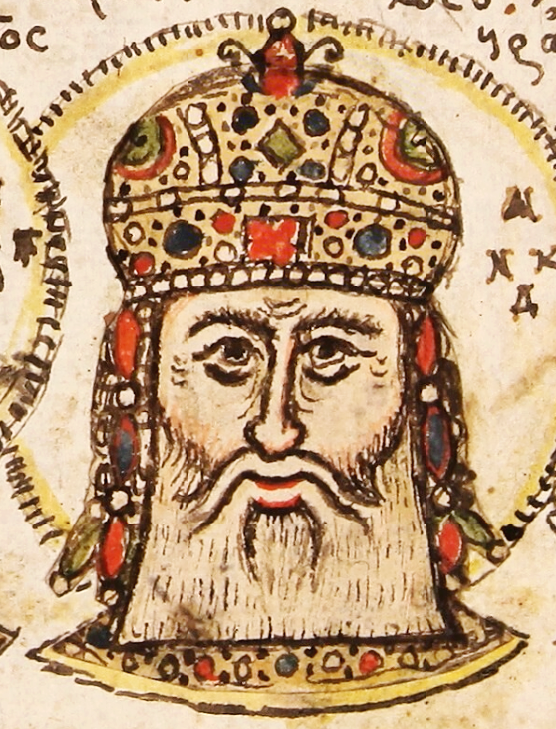
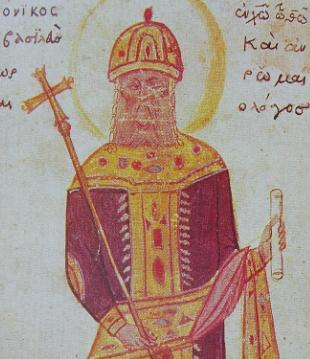
Andronikos II Palaiologos as depicted in Mutinensis gr. 122 (left) and in the 13th-century History of George Pachymeres (note the distinct square-shaped beard present in both). The similarity between the portraits in Mutinensis gr. 122 and other sources with images of emperors suggest that the scribes were attempting to faithfully depict the emperors.

The imperial portraits contained in the codex are not naturalistic and are often drawn very similarly to each other. Prominent features of each emperor, such as the shape or absence of their beards and the shapes of their eyebrows or noses, does however indicate that the creators of the portraits were attempting to faithfully depict the emperors in the manuscript.

The many different beards and distinct features of some emperors were not drawn for the sake of variety, but likely based on other then-existing manuscripts or textual sources, as well as on coinage. Though most portraits were seen as imaginary in the past (especially those of the more ancient emperors), it is now considered probable that the scribes used surviving contemporary sources to create the portraits. Whether the portraits hold value as accurate representations is debated; they compare well to portraits in other, older manuscripts, but they are also often distinct from each other in only a few features.

=== Portraits of the late emperors ===
The portraits of the Palaiologan dynasty (the final imperial dynasty, ruling from the 13th to 15th centuries) emperors in the codex accord well with portraits in other sources. In Mutinensis gr. 122, Michael VIII Palaiologos (r. 1259–1282) is depicted as having a long beard, possibly worn in a net, which is also depicted in other sources for the emperor's appearance, such as a chrysobull in the Vatican Archives and another Medieval manuscript, Monac gr. 442. Michael VIII's son and successor, Andronikos II Palaiologos (r. 1282–1328) is depicted with a wide and square-shaped beard in the codex, a depiction also corroborated by how he is portrayed in chrysobulls and other manuscripts. John VI Kantakouzenos (r. 1347–1354) is also depicted in several portraits in another manuscript, Par. gr. 1242, wherein all portraits show him with a long beard split into two, as in the Mutinensis gr. 122. The portrait of John V Palaiologos (r. 1341–1376, 1379–1390, 1390–1391), showing him as possessing a beard ending in two points, is similar to how the emperor is depicted in the chrysobull of his confession of the Roman Catholic faith (from 1369) and to how he once was depicted on a mosaic in the Hagia Sophia. There are no significant differences between how John VII Palaiologos (r. 1390) is depicted in the Mutinensis gr. 122 and how he is depicted in the only other known portrait of the emperor, in the manuscript Par. gr. 1783. The portraits of Manuel II Palaiologos (r. 1391–1425) and John VIII Palaiologos (r. 1425–1448) are very similar to portraits in other sources, Manuel always being depicted with a white beard ending in two points and with a long, straight nose and John always possessing a similar beard and an obliquely set nose. The portrait of the final emperor, Constantine XI, is similar to how he is depicted on contemporary seals, as well as the recently discovered 15th century portrait of him in the Old Monastery of Taxiarches, Aigialeia, which was discovered in December 2024. The lack of known portraits outside the codex of emperors Michael IX Palaiologos and Andronikos IV Palaiologos means that their portraits can't be compared to depictions in other sources. In addition, the only other depiction of Andronikos III Palaiologos (r. 1328–1341), a miniature, is damaged, also making comparisons difficult.

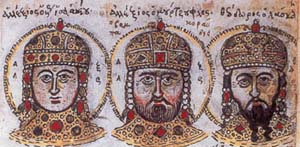
Portraits of Alexios IV Angelos, Alexios V Doukas and Theodore I Laskaris in Mutinensis gr. 122

Comparative material is somewhat lacking for the Angelid (1185–1204) and Laskarid (1204–1261) dynasties. The Laskarid emperors (with the exception of John IV, who was a child) are all depicted as having peculiar beards with curled ends. On coins, their beards end in two short points, possibly an attempt at depicting something similar, and in another manuscript, Monac. gr. 442, Theodore II Laskaris (r. 1254–1258) is depicted with the same type of beard. Both Isaac II Angelos (r. 1185–1195, 1203–1204) and Alexios III Angelos (r. 1195–1203) are portrayed on their coins as having pointed beards, reflected in the codex's depiction of Isaac II, but the codex depicts Alexios III with a beard cut short. Alexios V Doukas (r. 1204), nicknamed Murtzuphlos in his lifetime due to his bushy eyebrows, is depicted with this signature feature in the Mutinensis gr. 122.

As for the Palaiologoi emperors, there are several independently created portraits of the emperors of the Komnenian dynasty (1081–1185). The portraits of these emperors in Mutinensis gr. 122 generally accord well with other known portraits. Alexios I Komnenos (r. 1081–1118) is depicted with a square-shaped beard in the codex, a feature shared with depictions of the emperor in another manuscript, Vat. gr. 666. Alexios I's successor John II Komnenos is represented in the codex with a rounded beard, a feature also reflected in other sources such as a mosaic in the Hagia Sophia and a depiction in the manuscript Vat. Urb. gr. 2. The third Komnenos emperor, Manuel I Komnenos (r. 1143–1180), is depicted with a short beard in his coinage and in the manuscript Vat. gr. 1176, a feature shared by his portrait in the Mutinensis gr. 122. Manuel's heir, the child emperor Alexios II Komnenos (r. 1180–1183) is depicted without a beard and Alexios II's successor, his uncle and the adventurer Andronikos I Komnenos (r. 1183–1185) is depicted as an old man with a long, white beard ending in two points, similar to how he is depicted in his own coins. The shape of the Byzantine imperial crown was changed in the 12th century, gaining a semi-spherical top, which is reflected in portraits of emperors in the codex from John II onwards.

=== Reliability ===
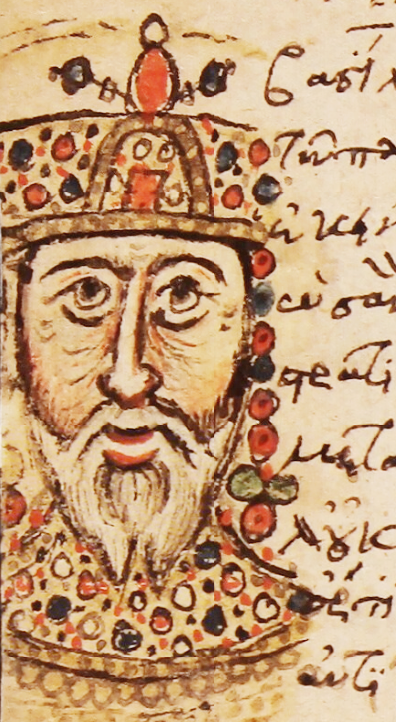
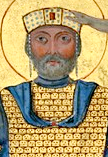
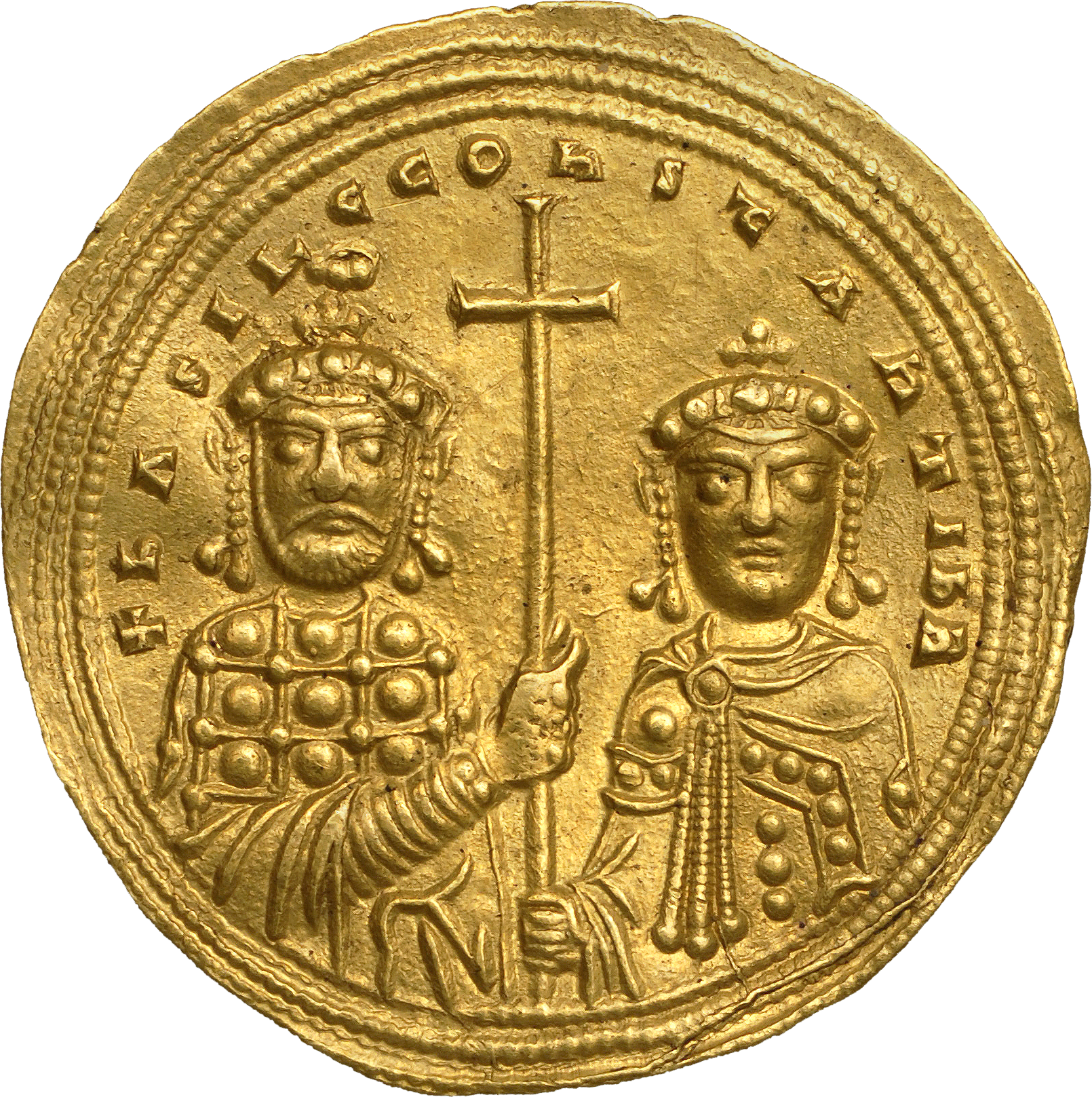
Portraits of Basil II in Mutinensis gr. 122 (left), an 11th-century codex (center) and on his coinage (right; the left figure). Basil II is one of the few clear cases where the codex portrait accords poorly with other known portraits.

Since the manuscript dates to the 15th century, the portraits of later dynasties are more likely to be reliable than portraits of earlier dynasties. From the 7th century onwards, portraits in Mutinensis gr. 122 are very similar to portraits in other sources. After Heraclius (r. 610–641), there are few examples of portraits with clear differences to portraits in other sources. Portraits before Heraclius are likely to be largely, or entirely, imaginary. For instance, the portrait of Constantine the Great depicts him with a mustache, absent in contemporary depictions of the emperor. Different garments and crowns are applied to different early emperors, but the designs are all imaginary and do not match known ancient Roman imperial regalia.

Two prominent examples of post-Heraclius portraits that appear to be erroneous are those of Theophilos (r. 829–842) and Basil II (r. 976–1025). The portrait of Basil II is entirely unlike portraits of the emperor in other sources, and the portrait of Theophilos is equally dissimilar from his portraits on contemporary coins, though in Theophilos' case the coins were highly schematized and produced during the Iconoclastic period and probably carry little relevance in terms of being accurate likenesses. The portrait of Heraclius in the codex is similar to portraits of the emperor on a rare set of early coins, but dissimilar from portraits from the last 30 or so years of his reign. The portraits of emperors Constantine VII (r. 913–959), Romanos I (r. 920–944), Romanos II (r. 959–963) and Nikephoros II do not match the highly standardized portraits on the coinage of these emperors, though perhaps other sources were used for these portraits. The portrait of Romanos IV Diogenes (r. 1068–1071) is similar to the portraits on the coinage of Romanos III Argyros (r. 1028–1034). There are also examples of portraits of earlier emperors that match other depictions very well. For instance, the portrait of Michael V Kalaphates (r. 1041–1042) closely matches the depiction on his coins, with the same head/face shape, beard and mustache.

== Historiographical analysis ==
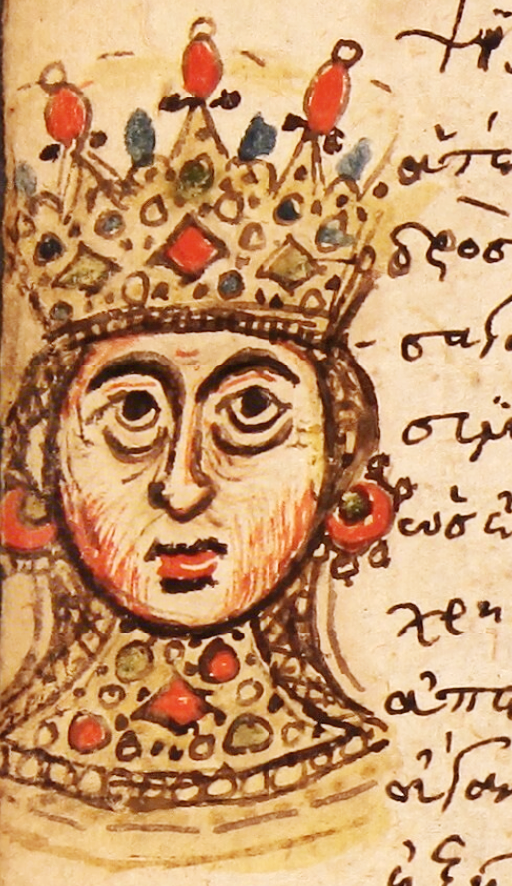
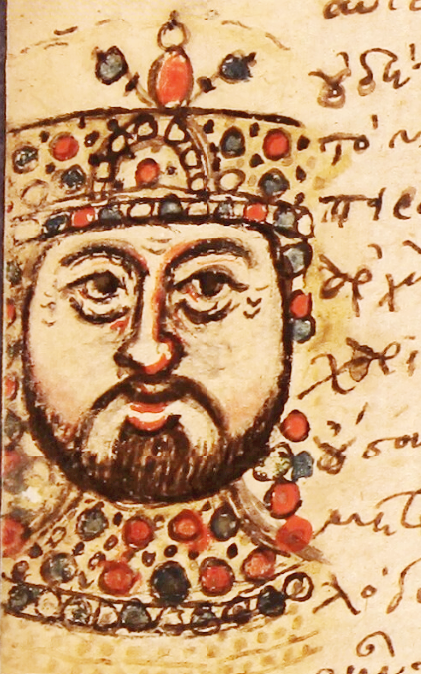
The portraits of Zoë Porphyrogenita (left) and her husband Constantine IX Monomachos (right)

In 2001, Petre Guran found the inclusion of John VI Kantakouzenos in the sequence of portraits to be noteworthy, as well as this emperor being depicted with a halo, like all the other emperors. Though John VI held supreme power in Constantinople from 1347 to 1354, his reign constituted a brief interruption in the rule of the Palaiologos dynasty (the last set of portraits having been created after a sequence of Palaiologos emperors had also reigned after John) and he also ended his career as a monk, not an emperor, after having been deposed.

Barbara Hill, Liz James and Dion Smythe erroneously claimed in 1994 that the codex only includes portraits of male rulers, omitting portraits of the ruling empresses Irene, Theodora and Zoë. Hill, James and Smythe believed that this exclusion of the ruling empresses may perhaps be attributable to the scribes behind the codex viewing 'imperial' as exclusively pertaining to men. Contrary to the claim in their study, Mutinensis gr. 122 does contain portraits of Zoë and Theodora (though Irene does not have a portrait). Excluding Zoë and Theodora would have been strange, since numerous other Byzantine writings and artworks show them as being on the same level as the male emperors. Notably, the Madrid Skylitzes depicts Zoë's marriages to emperors (her co-rulers) Romanos III, Michael IV and Constantine IX, in each case appearing to note Zoë as being ahead of her consorts in power and prestige. A notable detail of the portraits of the empresses in Mutinensis gr. 122 is that they are depicted with radiate crowns, different in design from those of the male rulers. Though the crowns of Byzantine empresses are not described in any known surviving literary source, other surviving Byzantine depictions of empresses also depict crowns of female rulers and consorts in this way, confirming the designs to be accurate.

== Selected portraits ==
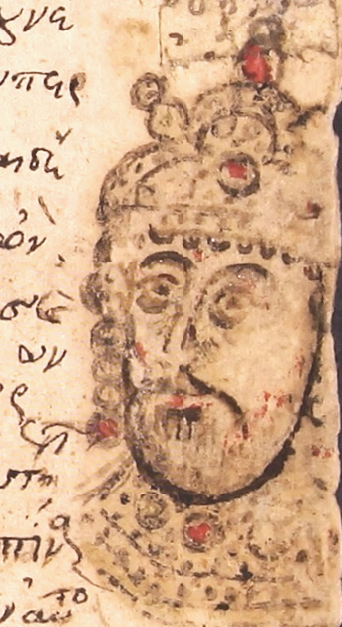
An imaginary portrait of Nero (r. 54–68), depicting him with an invented and ahistorical set of imperial regalia.

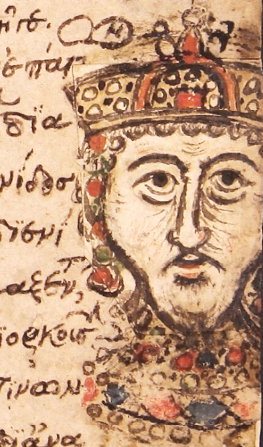
An imaginary portrait of Constantine the Great (r. 306–337), depicting him with an ahistorical mustache.

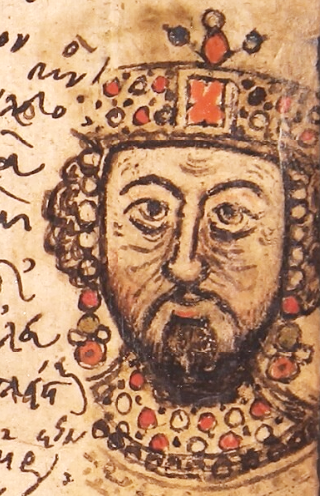
An imaginary portrait of Zeno (r. 474–491), whose reign saw the end of the western line of emperors.

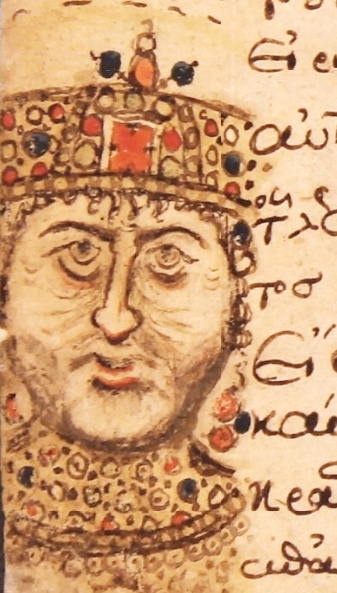
An imaginary portrait of Justinian the Great (r. 527–565), whose reign was marked by the ambitious but only partly realized renovatio imperii, or the "restoration of the Empire".

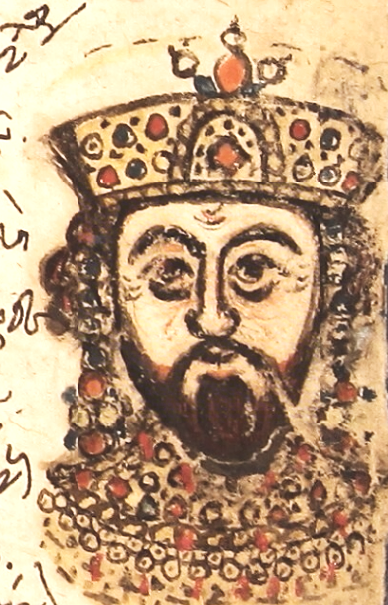
Portrait of Heraclius (r. 610–641), whose reign saw the loss of Byzantine Egypt and the Levant to the Rashidun Caliphate.

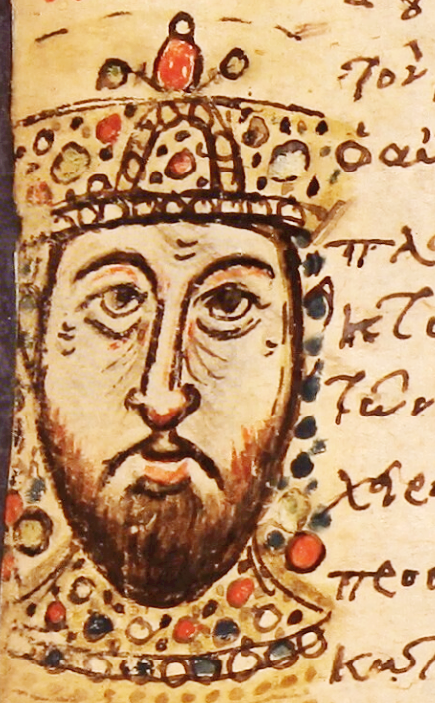
Portrait of Michael V Kalaphates (r. 1041–1042), noted as being very similar to how he is depicted on his coinage.

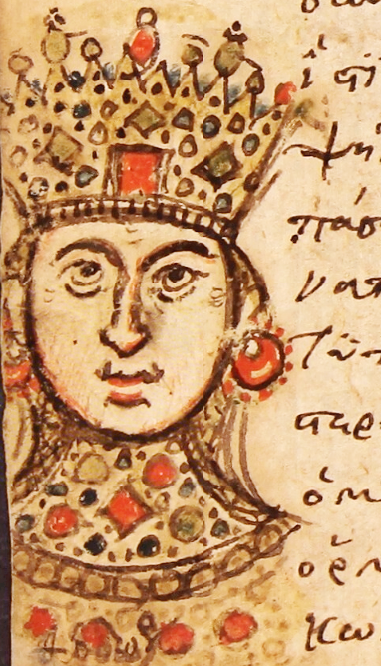
Portrait of Theodora Porphyrogenita (r. 1042–1056), depicting her as richly attired, but with few characteristic features, similar to how she is depicted in her coinage.

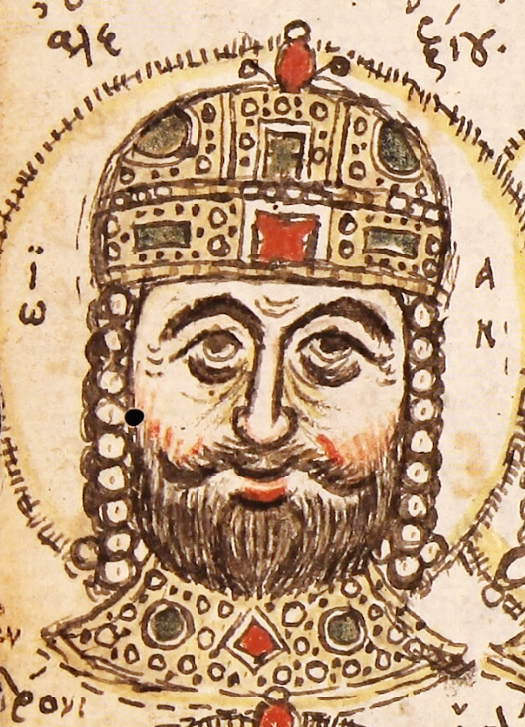
The Byzantine crown was augmented with a spherical top in the 12th century, a change reflected in the portraits from John II Komnenos (r. 1118–1143) onwards.

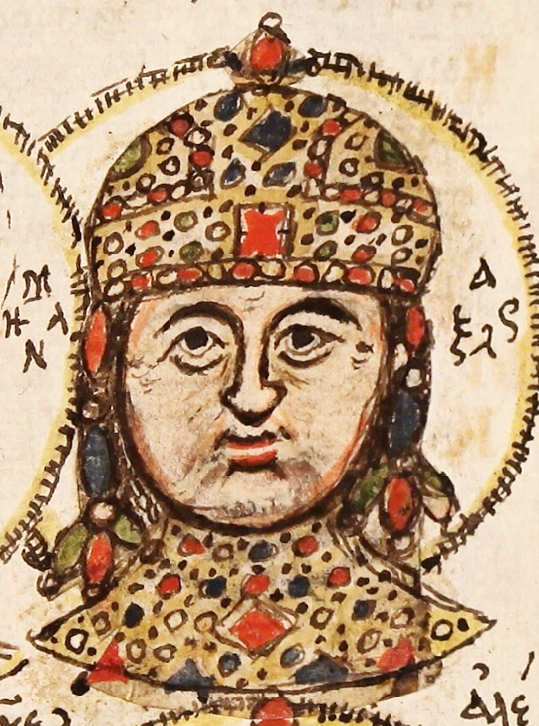
Child emperors who did not reach adulthood, such as Alexios II Komnenos (r. 1180–1183), are depicted without beards in the codex.

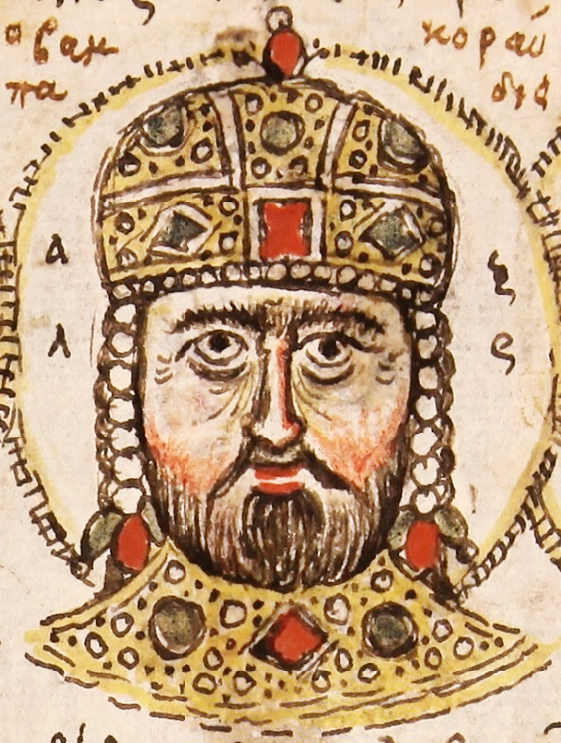
Alexios V Doukas (r. 1204) depicted with bushy eyebrows, his signature feature.

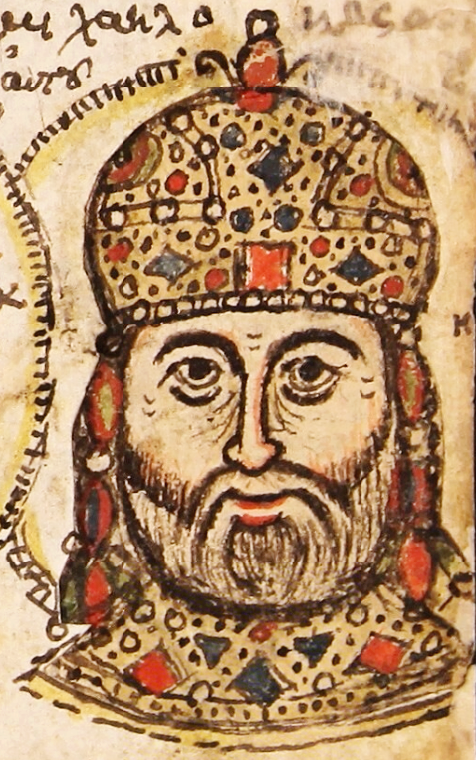
Portrait of Michael IX Palaiologos (r. 1294–1320), the only known surviving portrait of this emperor.

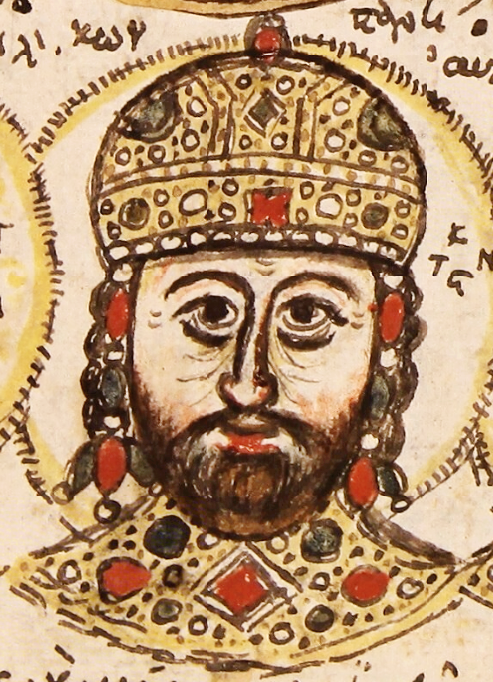
Portrait of Constantine XI Palaiologos (r. 1449–1453), the last Byzantine emperor.
