= San Francesco del Prato, Parma =

Church building in Parma, Italy

Coordinates: 44°48′18.119″N 10°20′0.136″E

Saint Francis of Prato, Parma
- San Francesco del Prato
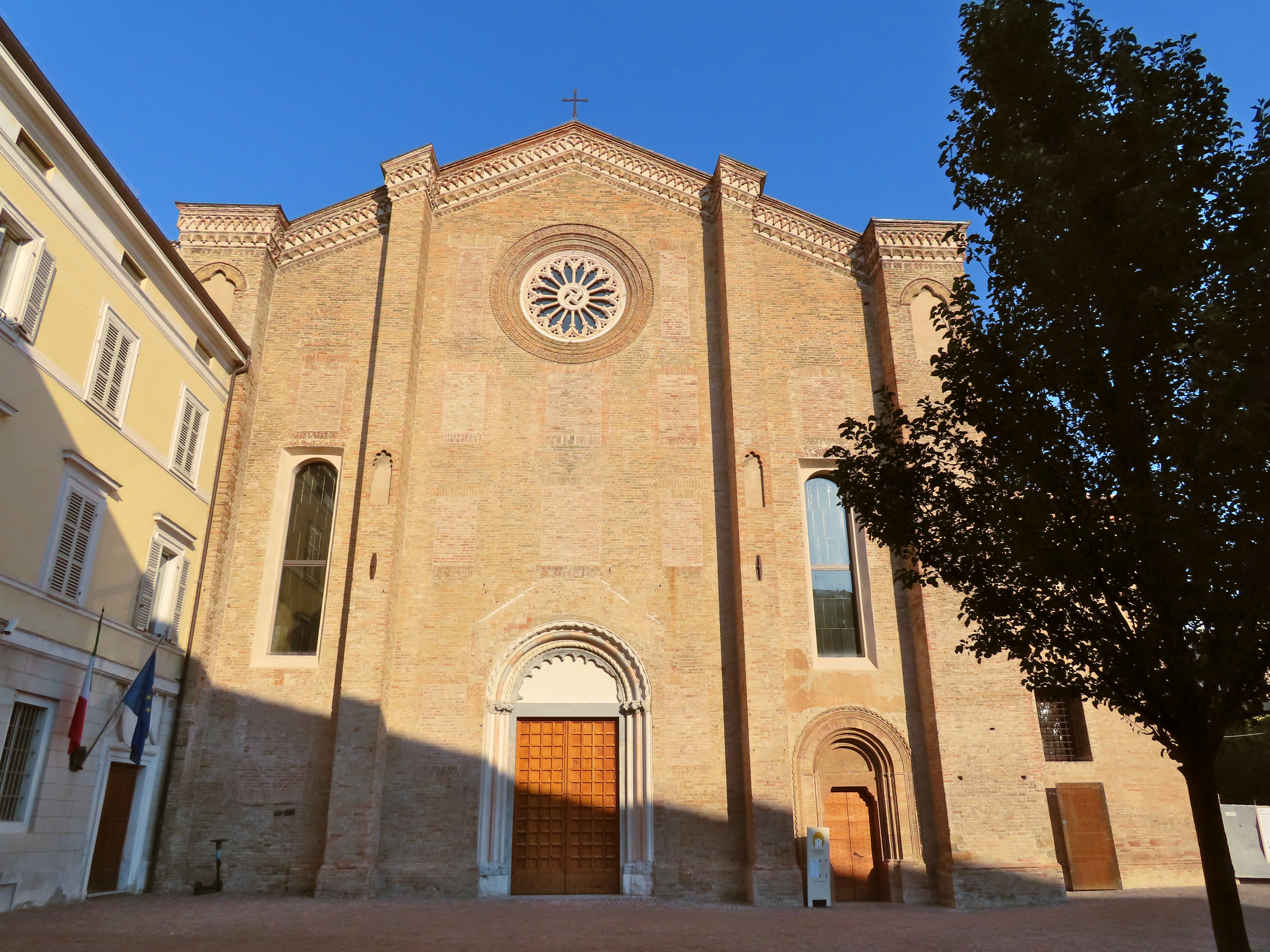
- Saint Francis of Prato, Parma
- Location: Parma, Emilia-Romagna
- Address: via del Prato, Piazzale San Francesco 4
- Country: Italy
- Denomination: Catholic
- Tradition: Roman Rite
- Religious institute: Order of Friars Minor Conventual
- Website: www.sanfrancescodelprato.it

History
- Status: diocesan sanctuary
- Founder: Franciscans
- Dedication: Francis of Assisi
- Consecrated: early 13th century (original); 3 October 2021 (reconsecration)

Architecture
- Functional status: active
- Heritage designation: Italian national heritage
- Architectural type: Basilica
- Style: Italian Gothic; Brick Gothic
- Groundbreaking: 1227
- Completed: 1462
- Closed: 1810 (de jure)

Specifications
- Length: 70 metres (229 ft 8 in)
- Materials: Brick, Terracotta

Administration
- Diocese: Parma

San Francesco del Prato is a Gothic, Roman Catholic church, located on Piazzale San Francesco #4 in central Parma, Italy. In front stands the 15th-century Palazzo Cusani.

== History ==
Founded by the Franciscan order, the first church on the site was built 1227–1238. Their adjacent school once housed the theologian Bartholomew Mastrius. The building was lengthened and finished around 1462. The façade has a Gothic rosette in a terracotta frame.

Atypically, the building is not on a pure east–west axis. The apse is oriented towards the sunrise following the longest night of the year, while the façade is oriented towards the sunset of the longest day of the year.

The nave has three aisles, separated by columns, with a higher central one. The cupola pinnacles were painted by Michele Anselmi. The apse has an aged fresco depicting Christ Pantocrator attributed to Bartolino de' Grossi and his son-in-law Jacopo Loschi.

The Oratorio della Concezione (Oratory of the Immaculate Conception) was built as a chapel annexed to the church. It was designed by Bernardino Zaccagni and Giovanni Francesco Ferrari d'Agrate in the 16th century. It was decorated with frescos by Michelangelo Anselmi and Francesco Rondani in 1532–1533. Zaccagni also designed the bell tower.

Until it was looted by Napoleonic troops in 1803, the main altar of the oratory had a painting of The Conception of Our Lady, by Girolamo Mazzola Bedoli and Pier Ilaro Mazzola. In 1816, the painting was restored, but is now displayed in the Galleria Nazionale di Parma. There is a copy in the oratory. Most of the other paintings once in the church have either been destroyed, dispersed, or are now in either the church of Santissima Trinità Vecchia, or in the Galleria Nazionale di Parma.

After the suppression of the rites in 1800, the church became a city jail. Cells were in the nave, and this led to a replacement of the windows, and covering of the frescos. The bell-tower held isolation cells for special prisoners.

The building continued to be a prison until 1970. The structure was returned to the Diocese of Parma in 2018 and has once more been entrusted to the Conventual Franciscan Friars.

== Restoration ==
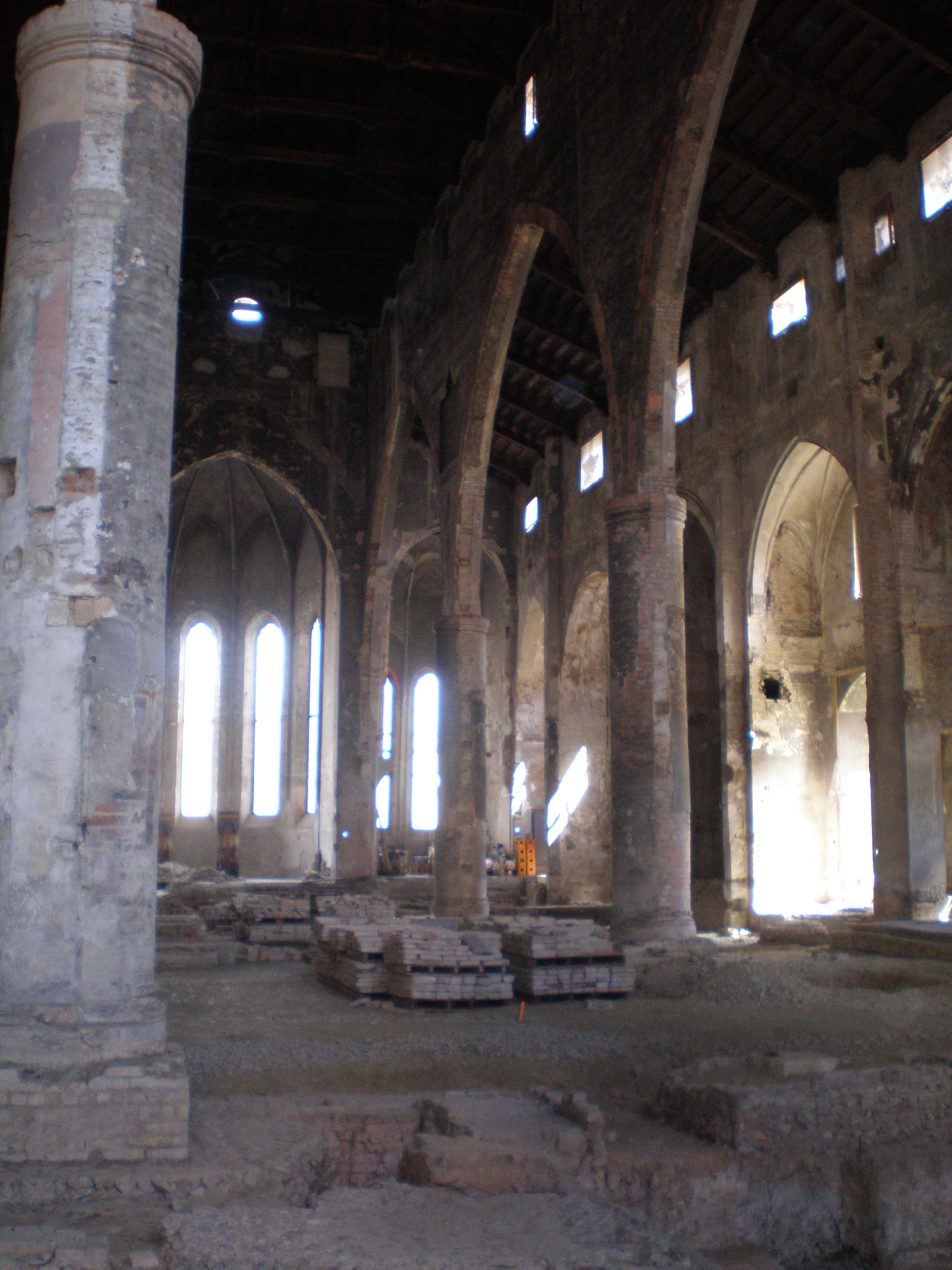
Interior in need of restoration

The church has been undergoing restoration work.

On the façade, the prison windows have been closed; two large single-lancet windows which were found during the restoration were largely intact. The door on the left aisle was reopened. Frescoes in the apse have been partially restored.
