= Bernardino Loschi =

Italian painter (1460–1540)

- Born: 1460; Parma, Italy
- Died: 1540 (aged 79–80); Carpi, Italy
- Known for: Painting
- Movement: Renaissance

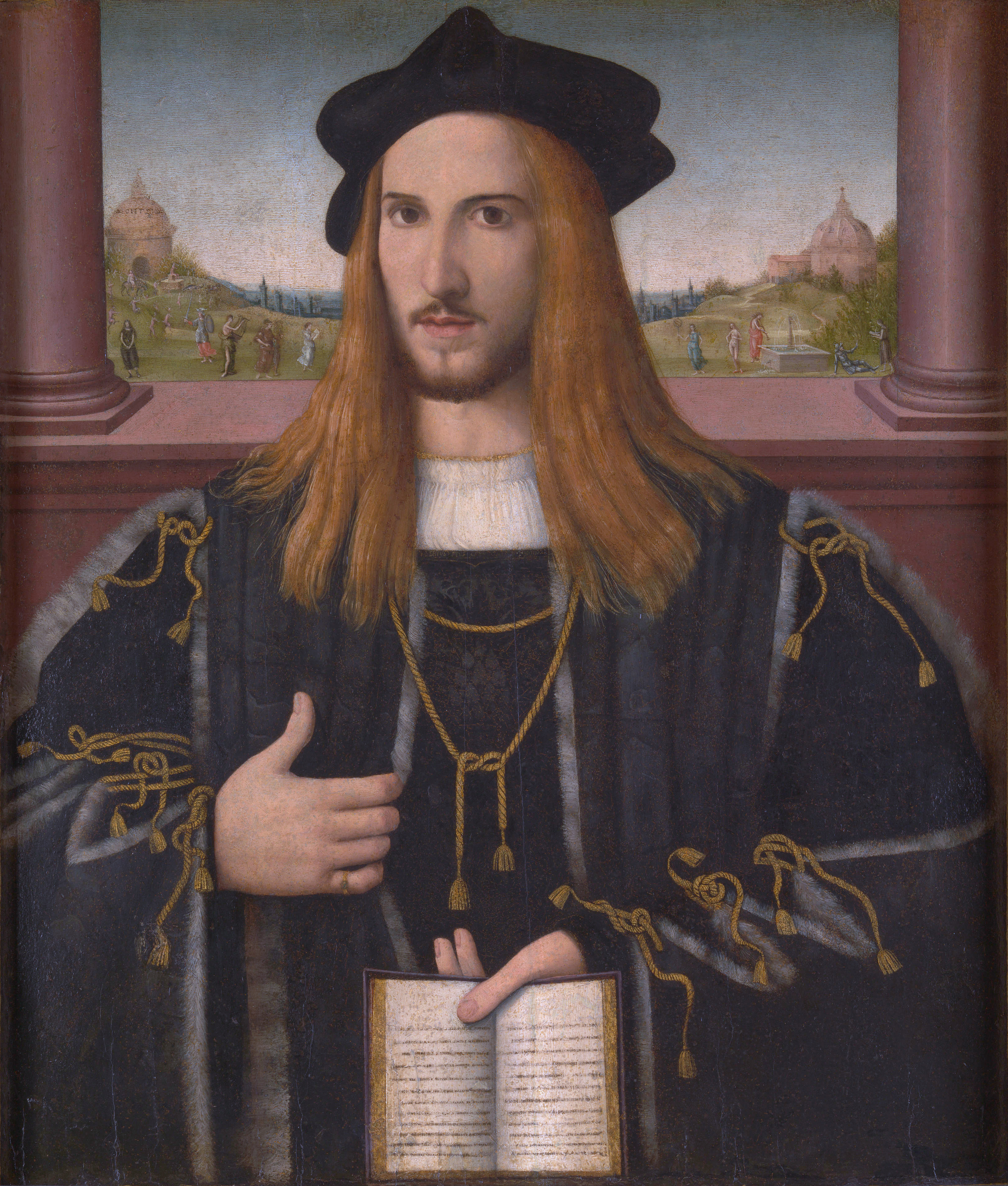
Portrait of Alberto III Pio, attributed to Bernardino Loschi.

Bernardino Loschi (1460 – 1540) was an Italian painter of the Renaissance.

Born in Parma, he was the son of the painter Jacopo Loschi, and is known to have worked for Alberto III Pio, Lord of Carpi, from 1500 onwards. He was assigned by the prince to be superintendent of the ongoing decorations of the Cathedral, the church of San Niccolò (dome frescoes), and of certain rooms in the castle. In collaboration with Giovanni del Sega, he frescoed the Alberto Pio chapel. Among his works are:

- A Coronation of the Virgin with Saint Geminiano and Felice (1500) for the church of San Felice sul Panaro.
- A Madonna and child with Saint Augustine and Nicola (1515) now in Galleria Estense of Modena.
- A San Rocco for Church of San Niccolò in Carpi.
- The portrait of Alberto III Pio (1512) in the National Gallery of London, has been attributed to him.

== Sources ==
- Entry in Treccani Enciclopedia Italiana
