= Jacopo Loschi =

Italian painter

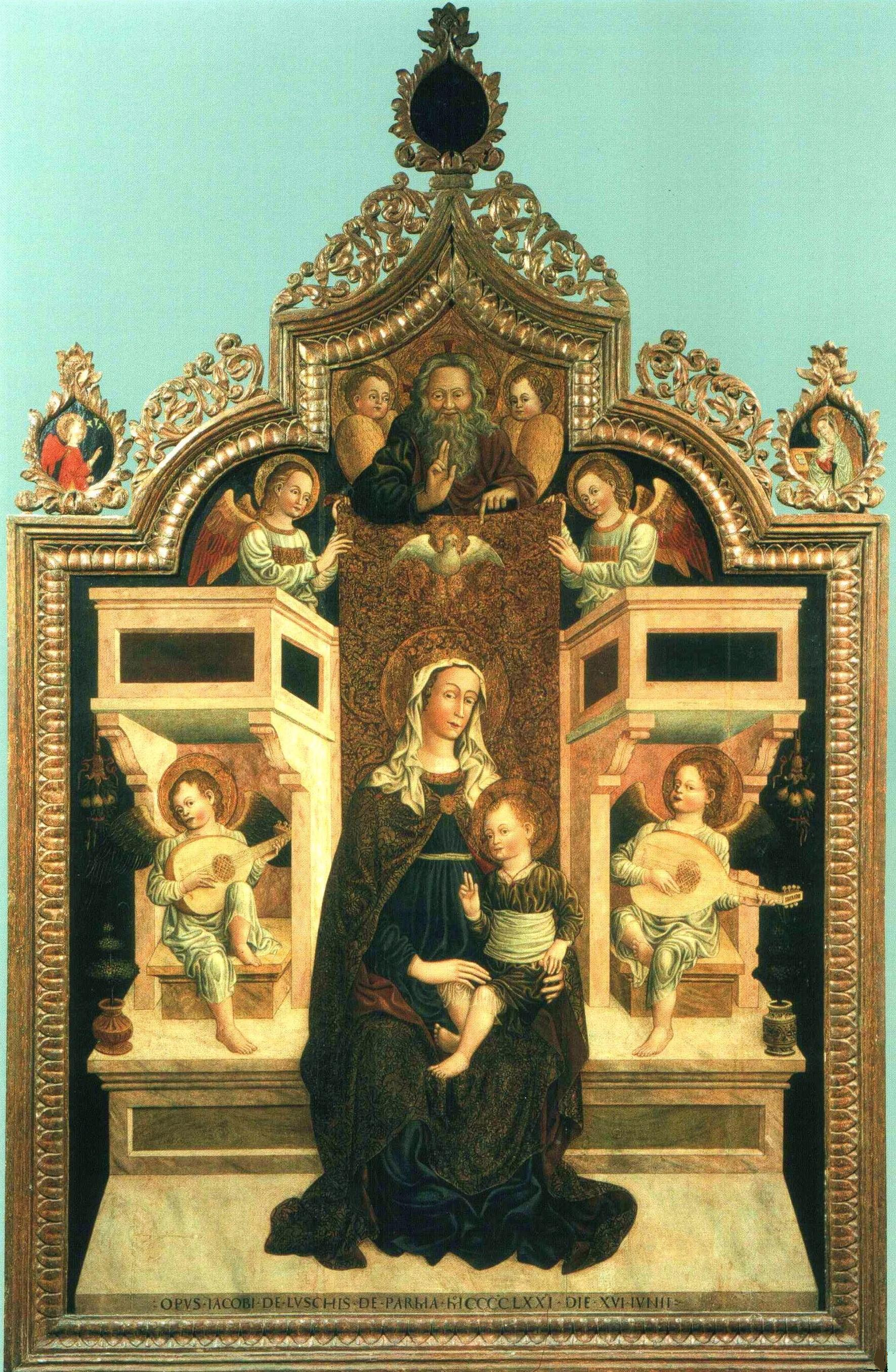
J.Loschi Madonna and Child and Angels

Jacopo Loschi or Jacopo d' Ilario Loschi (Parma, 1425 – Carpi, 1504) was an Italian painter.

== Biography ==
He was born in Parma and was the son-in-law of Bartolino de' Grossi, with whom he painted in San Francesco al Prato (Parma) in 1462. He was active in Parma till 1496, when he moved to Carpi. He painted a Madonna delle Grazie for the church of the Serviti in Carpi. His sons Cosimo and Bernardino Loschi (active 1501, died 1540) was also a painter, mainly in Carpi.

Most of his works are located in the National Gallery of Parma, including:

- Madonna and child with Angels and God the father (altarpiece dated 1471 from church of Sant'Agostino)
- Triptych of the Visitation with Saints Ilario and Jerome.
- Fresco of Madonna and child and Angels with St Sebastian and Rocco with lunette of Christ in Passion, (1470, Oratory of San Girolamo).
- Fresco of Madonna and child with saints Jerome and John the Baptist, with lunette of God the Father), (1470, Oratory of San Girolamo).
