= Sega (disambiguation) =

Sega is a Japanese video game software developer and hardware development company.

Sega or SEGA may also refer to:

- Sega (genre), a music genre that originated in Mauritius
- Sega Pinball, a former division of Sega for pinball and arcade machines
- Subependymal giant cell astrocytoma, a low-grade brain tumor associated with tuberous sclerosis
- "Now" in Macedonian and Bulgarian

== People with the surname ==
- Andrew Sega (born 1975), American musician
- Filippo Sega (1537–1596), Italian bishop and cardinal
- Francesco della Sega (1528–1565), Italian antitrinitarian executed by the Venetian Inquisition
- Giovanni del Sega (c. 1450–1527), Italian painter
- Ronald M. Sega (born 1952), professor of systems engineering, former NASA astronaut

== See also ==
- Segagaga, 2001 role-playing video game
