= Palazzo Cusani, Parma =

Palace in Parma, Italy

Coordinates: 44.8050°N 10.3331°E

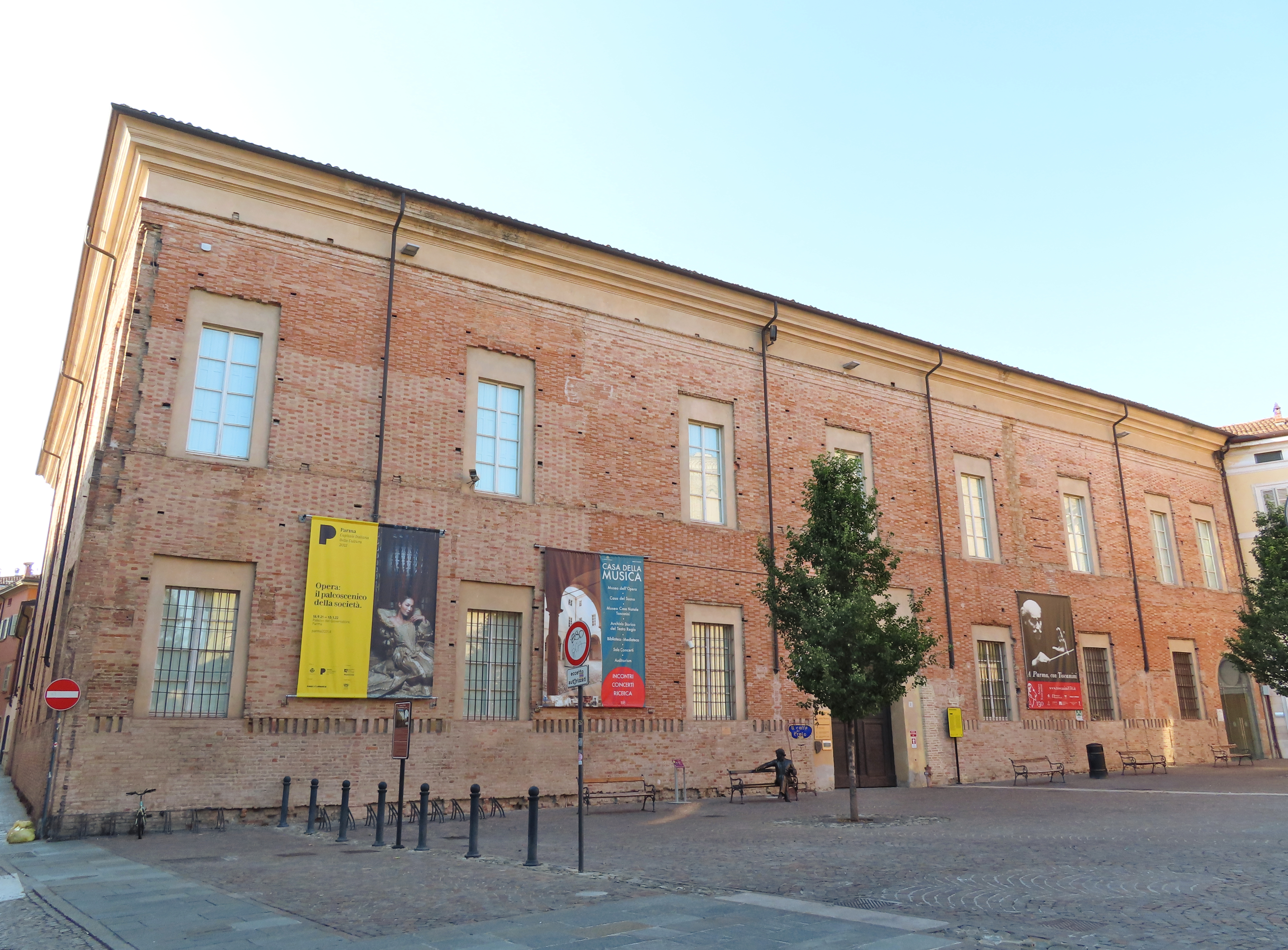
Façade

The Palazzo Cusani is a palace at Piazzale San Francesco #1 in the central Parma region of Emilia-Romagna, Italy.

== History ==
The palace was constructed around 1450 by the Cusani family. It stands in front of the church of San Francesco del Prato. In 1612 the marchese Galeazzo Cusani donated the building to the Comune of Parma. In 1768, it was given to the University of Parma. Ten years later, the Duke Ferdinando di Borbone housed the Duchy's mint (Zecca) in the palace. In 1820 the duchess Maria Luigia installed the courts in the palace. From 1924 to 1983, the palace housed a middle school. The earthquake that year forced relocation of the school and reconstruction of the site.

The simple brick palace is now a library and an archive for music and theater, and is known as the Casa dell Musica, and includes an auditorium and other performance halls. The site also houses the National Institute of Studi Verdiani (National Institute for Verdi Studies).
