= Battista Guarino =

Italian humanist and teacher

Battista Guarino (Latin: Baptista Guarinus; 1434–1513(?)) was the youngest son of Guarino da Verona. He was one of the most significant humanists of his time in northern Italy. Guarino was also an active teacher. He is the presumed author of the ballad Alda.

== Literature ==
- Daniela Bermond (Bremen, Germany): Der Stellenwert rhetorischer Bildung in humanistischen ‚Lehrplänen’ von Battista Guarino dem Jüngeren bis zu Castiglione (German, The value of rhetorical education in human curricula from Battista Guarino the Younger until Castiglione)
