= Alberto III Pio =

Italian nobleman

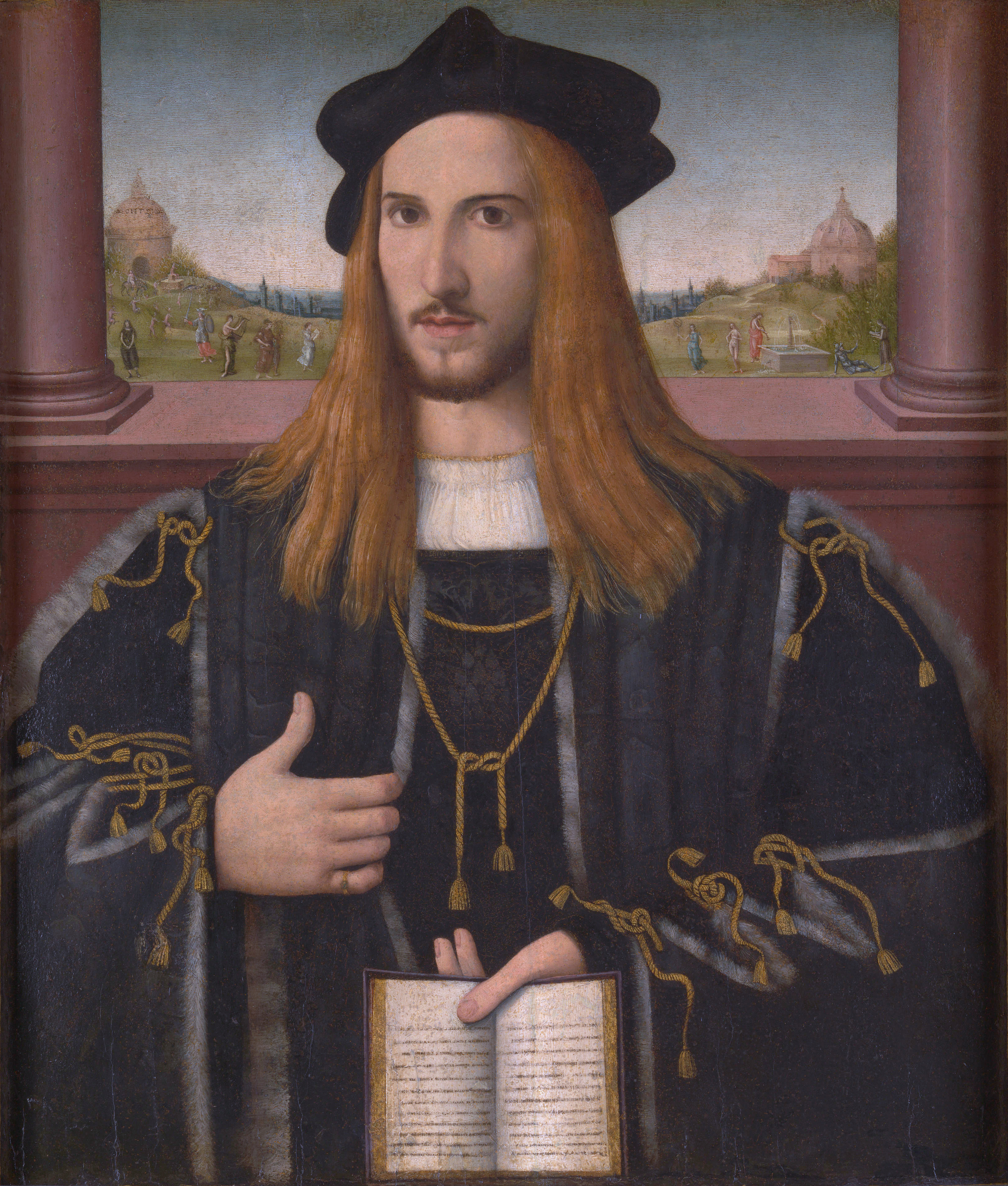
Alberto III Pío, portrait in the National Gallery (London) attributed to Bernardino Loschi.

Alberto III Pio di Savoia (23 July 1475 – 8 January 1531), was an Italian Renaissance nobleman and diplomat, joint Lord and later Count of Carpi, between 1477 and 1525. He was commonly known as Alberto Pio da Carpi or simply as Carpi. He cultivated interest in humanism and was an intimate of the Medici popes.

== Biography ==
He was born in Carpi, the eldest child of Caterina Pico and Lionello I Pio di Savoia, co-ruler of the Lordship of Carpi together with his cousin Marco II

His father died when he was two years old, and he and his newborn brother, also named Lionello, were raised under the guardianship of their mother and Marco II. They supervised the education of the two children and, reportedly at the suggestion of Caterina's brother, Giovanni Pico della Mirandola (albeit at the time little more than a boy) engaged as tutor Aldus Manutius, who was later to found the famed Aldine Press in Venice, which Alberto funded.

Since Lionello I and Marco II had obtained a decree from Emperor Frederick III in 1470 introducing primogeniture in Carpi, Alberto III was his father's sole successor as joint Lord of Carpi. In fact, however, Marco II managed to keep him away from political affairs for a long time (as well as from caring for his allodial estates—his mother having remarried in 1484), initially due to his young age, and later due to his long stay abroad to complete his studies. He was educated first at Ferrara, where he attended lectures by Pietro Pomponazzi and became friends with Pietro Bembo and Ludovico Ariosto, then at Padua.

Alberto III eventually obtained the investiture of joint lordship from Emperor Frederick III and returned to Carpi in 1490. After Marco II's death in 1494, disagreements with his son and successor, Giberto III Pio di Savoia, led to the outbreak of a full-blown civil war, followed by the peacemaking intervention of the Duke of Ferrara, Ercole I d'Este. According to the arbitration imposed by him in 1599, Giberto III renounced in his favor his share of the lordship over Carpi and was in exchange invested with the Este fiefdom of Sassuolo; Alberto III instead remained the only Pio to rule Carpi, but had to accept the dangerous Este neighbour as joint Lord.

For most of his career he would serve as a diplomat, first as the agent of the Gonzaga to the French court and later in the pay of King Louis XII. In 1508 he was one of the negotiators of the League of Cambrai and also managed to gain the favour of the Emperor Maximilian I: thus on 14 June of the following year he obtained from him a decree with which the new Duke of Ferrara Alfonso I d'Este was stripped of his sovereign rights over Carpi and the fiefdom was erected into a county. In January 1510 he became the Emperor's ambassador to the Papacy, but in 1520, after the ascendancy of Charles V, Alberto committed a fatal error by switching again his allegiance to France.

Alberto was a close friend of Pope Leo X and is known to have favoured the election of Giulio de' Medici to the Papacy as Clement VII. He helped to bring about the alliance between Clement and Francis I, King of France that was published on 5 January 1525 and proposed the marriage between Catherine de'Medici, Clement's niece, and Francis' second son, Henry. Such diplomatic success had its consequences. Lope Hurtado de Mendoza (1499–1558), Charles V's representative in Rome, described Alberto as follows: "Carpi is a devil; he knows everything and is mixed up in everything; the Emperor must either win him over or destroy him." The latter was Alberto's fate, for after the papal alliance with Francis was made public, Charles was reported to have become enraged. Shortly thereafter on 24 February 1525 Charles' troops defeated and captured Francis at the Battle of Pavia, and eight days later his troops occupied Carpi under the command of the Marquis of Pescara, Fernando d'Ávalos, who had personal ambitions for the county despite the promises Charles V had made to the now deceased Prospero Colonna. Alberto was deposed for "felony," that is, for breaching the oath of fealty that bound him to the Emperor, and his fief was consequently confiscated. Alberto remained in Rome and attempted to reclaim his county but without success. Eventually, in 1530, Charles invested Alfonso I d'Este with it, elevating it to a principality five years later.

When Charles' troops sacked Rome in May 1527, Alberto had sought refuge with Clement VII in the Castel Sant'Angelo. He then fled to France where he was warmly welcomed and where he remained until his death as a Franciscan Tertiary on 8 January 1531. He was honoured, on the 16th of that month, with a solemn funeral ceremony in the presence of Francis I.

Alberto had been a defender of the Church since the earliest discussions about its reformation arose at the Fifth Lateran Council in December 1513, well before the publication of Luther's 95 theses in 1517. By 1525 he had become embroiled in an extended dispute with Erasmus that continued for the remainder of his life and that was not concluded until two months after his death with the publication of his XXIII Libri.

== Bibliography ==
- Bertuzzi, Giordano (1977). Alberto Pio III, Signore di Carpi: (1475–1975) (in Italian). Modena: Aedes muratoriana.
- Forner, Fabio. "PIO, Alberto - Dizionario biografico degli italiani". Enciclopedia Treccani (in Italian).
- Guicciardini, Francesco (1837). Storia d'Italia (in Italian). Vol. I (1490-1534). Florence: Borghi.
- Ori, Anna Maria. "PIO - Dizionario biografico degli italiani". Enciclopedia Treccani (in Italian).
- Sabattini, Alberto (1994). Alberto III Pio: politica, diplomazia e guerra del conte di Carpi : corrispondenza con la corte di Mantova, 1506-1511 (in Italian). Alberto: Danae.
- Svalduz, Elena (2001). Da castello a città: Carpi e Alberto Pio (1472–1530) (in Italian). Roma: Officina edizioni. ISBN 978-88-87570-26-7.
