= Giovanni del Sega =

Italian painter

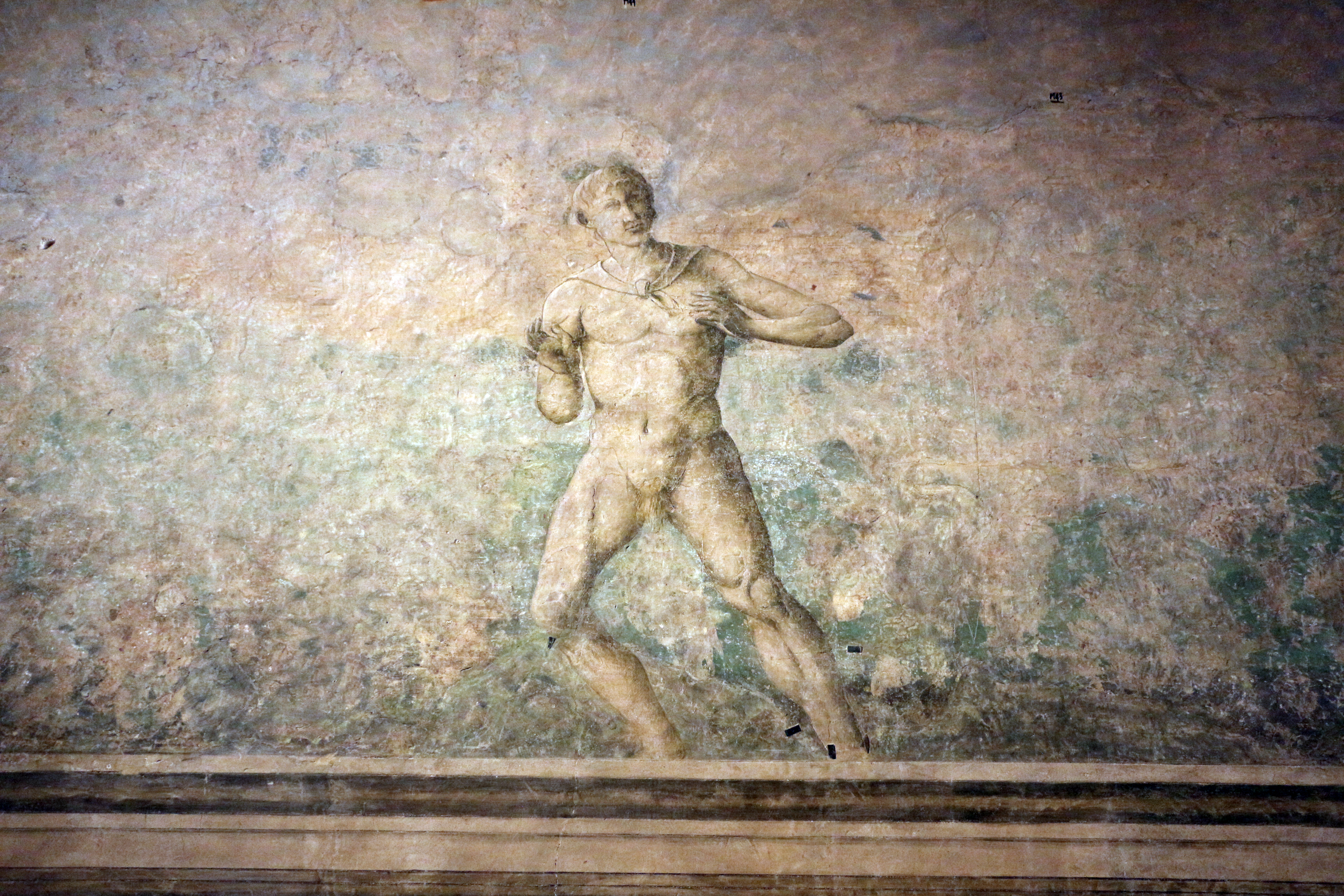
A fresco inside the Pio Castle in Carpi (1506)

Giovanni del Sega (c. 1450 – 1527) was an Italian painter of the Renaissance.

He was a student of Melozzo da Forlì, and was active mainly in Carpi. He collaborated in the decoration, now lost, of the facade of the Palazzo del Pio. In that palace, he also painted frescoes for the Sala dei Mori, an Annunciation.
