= Casa Gioiosa =

15th-century house in Mantua, Italy

Casa Gioiosa or The House of Joy was a 15th century house in Mantua, Italy, owned by the Gonzaga family where the Italian pedagogue Vittorino da Feltre in 1423, set up a humanist school. The Casa Gioiosa, was a pioneering educational institution that aimed to provide a holistic and humanistic education to its students and soon became a model for Renaissance education, influencing educational practices throughout Europe. It emphasized the ideals of humanism and the importance of education in fostering personal growth and civic responsibility.

== Overview ==
Situated between the Castello di San Giorgio and the Magna Domus, the Casa Gioiosa was originally constructed as a space for the pleasures and dances of the Gonzaga court. It was commissioned, likely by Francesco I Gonzaga, IV Captain of the People, who carried out substantial architectural and urbanistic interventions in the area.

In 1423, under the patronage of Gianfrancesco Gonzaga, the Marquess of Mantua, the Casa Gioiosa was repurposed as an educational institution. Gianfrancesco, known for his appreciation of arts and culture, entrusted Vittorino da Feltre, a renowned humanist educator, with the establishment. Vittorino founded a humanistic school and boarding house at the Casa Gioiosa, aiming to provide a comprehensive education to the children of the Gonzaga family and other noble Italian families.

Vittorino da Feltre's educational philosophy focused on a holistic approach, combining intellectual and physical education. In addition to subjects like rhetoric, mathematics, and philosophy, Vittorino emphasized physical education through games, fencing, running, horse riding, swimming, and ball games. The curriculum aimed to produce well-rounded individuals capable of contributing to society.

The Casa Gioiosa became a renowned center of Renaissance education, attracting students not only from noble Italian families but also from other regions. Many notable figures emerged from Vittorino's school, including politicians, prelates, and humanists. Vittorino's leadership of the school continued until his death in 1446, after which his pupils, such as Jacopo da San Cassiano and Ognibene da Lonigo, succeeded him.

== Notable alumni ==
- Ludovico III Gonzaga, Marquis of Mantua
- Barbara of Brandenburg, Marquise of Mantua
- Carlo Gonzaga of Milan
- Margherita Gonzaga, Marquise of Ferrara
- Federico I Gonzaga, Marquis of Mantua
- Federico da Montefeltro
- Battista Pallavicino
- Basinio Basini
- Giovanni Andrea Bussi
- Iacopo da San Cassiano
- George of Trebizond
- Theodorus Gaza
- Taddeo Manfredi
- Niccolò Perotti
- Lorenzo Valla
- Pietro Balbi

== See also ==
- Feltre School
