= Lapo da Castiglionchio =

Lapo da Castiglionchio may refer to:

- Lapo da Castiglionchio the Elder (c. 1316 – 1381), Florentine correspondent and friend of Petrarch and leader in the events before the Revolt of the Ciompi
- Lapo da Castiglionchio the Younger (c. 1405 – 1438), Florentine satirist
