= John of Ravenna =

John of Ravenna (Italian: Giovanni di [or da] Ravenna) may refer to:

- Giovanni Conversini (1343–1408), Italian humanist
- Giovanni Malpaghini (1346–1417), Italian humanist

A number of bishops and archbishops of Ravenna:

- John Angeloptes, bishop of Ravenna c. 430–433
- John II, bishop of Ravenna c. 477–494
- John III the Roman, or Giovanni III, archbishop of Ravenna 578–595
- John IV, archbishop of Ravenna 607–625
- John V, archbishop of Ravenna 625–c. 631
- John VI or Giovanni VI, archbishop of Ravenna c. 726–c. 744
- John VII, archbishop of Ravenna c. 777–c. 784
- John VIII, archbishop of Ravenna c. 850–878
- John IX, archbishop of Ravenna 898–904
- John of Tossignano, archbishop of Ravenna 905–914, later Pope John X
- John X (also called Giovanni Vincenzo or Giovanni da Besate), archbishop of Ravenna 983–998
- John Henry, archbishop of Ravenna 1051–1072
- Giovanni Migliorati (cardinal), archbishop of Ravenna 1400–1405
