= Gregorio Correr =

Gregorio Correr (Corraro) (1409 – 1464) was an Italian humanist and ecclesiastic from Venice. In the last year of his life he was elected Patriarch of Venice.

== Life ==
Coat of arms of Gregorio Correr

He was born into a patrician family of Venice; Antonio Correr was his uncle. As a youth he studied in the school of Vittorino da Feltre in Mantua.

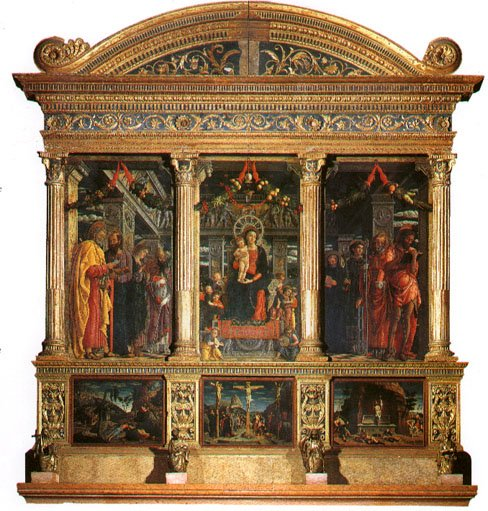
San Zeno altarpiece by Mantegna, a commission from Correr

Correr was created protonotary apostolic by Pope Eugenius IV, a relation. He went with the Curia to Florence, where he encountered the humanist circle of Biondo Flavio. He corresponded with Lapo da Castiglionchio the Younger.

He then served as secretary to his uncle Antonio at the Council of Basle. From 1448 he was an abbot at the Basilica of San Zeno, Verona. There he received the visit of another pupil of Vittorino, Iacopo da San Cassiano. He commissioned the celebrated San Zeno Altarpiece from Andrea Mantegna. He was nominated as bishop of Padua in 1459, but lost out to Pietro Barbo when Pope Pius II refused to accept the Venetian Senate's choice.

== Works ==
There is a codex of Correr's works. Around 1428 he wrote a Latin tragedy, Progne, based on the story of Procne in Ovid, and the play Thyestes by Seneca the Younger. He wrote also seven satires as a pupil in Mantua, and poetry, as he mentioned in correspondence with Cecilia Gonzaga. He wrote about 60 fables, and also a biography of Antonio
