= Donato Albanzani =

Italian humanist

- Born: 1328; Ravenna, Italy
- Died: 1411 (aged 82–83); Ferrara, Italy
- Occupations: rhetorician, grammarian, author, translator
- Scientific career
- Fields: Classics

Donato Albanzani (1328 – 1411) was a medieval Italian humanist, grammarian and rhetorician.

== Biography ==
He was born in 1328 in Pratovecchio Stia, Italy.

He died in 1411 in Ferrara, Italy.

== Education ==
He was a student of Giovanni Malpaghini.

== Career ==
He taught rhetoric and grammar from 1345 to 1346 in Ravenna, Italy.

He arrived in Ferrara in 1382 and became a tutor to Niccolò III d'Este, the son of Alberto V d'Este , Marquis of Ferrara and Modena.

== Bibliography ==
He is famous for producing commentaries on the works of Petrarch and for having translated Petrarch's work De viris illustribus and Boccaccio's De mulieribus claris from Latin to Italian.

His notable works include:

- De viris illustribus; Raccoglimento; Supplementum in librum de viris illustribus Francisci Petrarcae
- Le Vite degli uomini illustri

== See also ==
- Giovanni Malpaghini
- Giovanni Conversini
