= Camera degli Sposi =

Frescoed room in the Ducal Palace, Mantua, Italy

Coordinates: 45°09′40″N 10°48′00″E

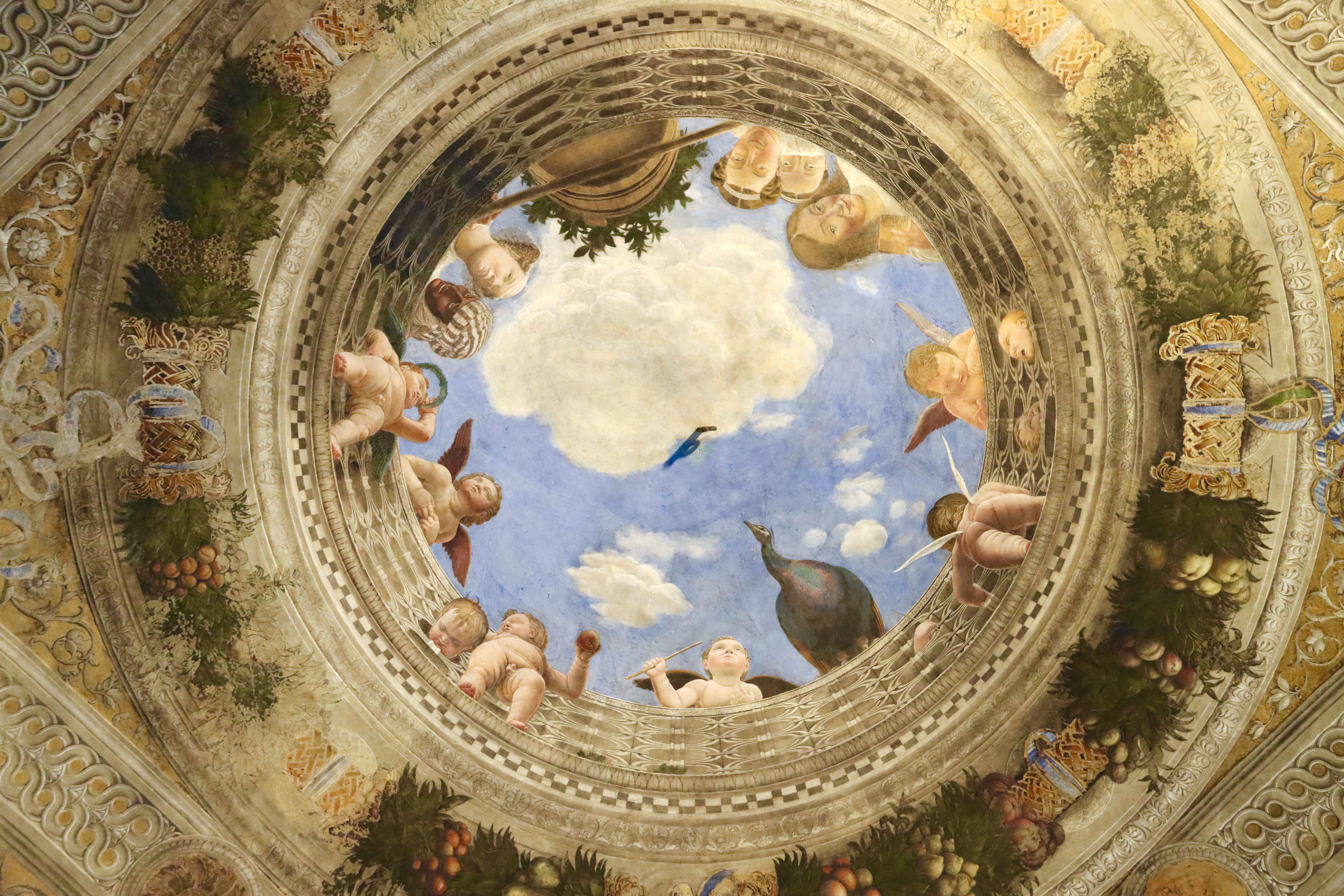
- Frescoes by Andrea Mantegna

General information
- Location: Palazzo Ducale, Mantua, Italy
- Construction started: 1465
- Completed: 1474

Design and construction
- Architect: Andrea Mantegna

The Camera degli Sposi ("bridal chamber"), sometimes known as the Camera picta ("painted chamber"), is a room frescoed with illusionistic paintings by Andrea Mantegna in the Ducal Palace, Mantua, Italy. During the fifteenth century when the Camera degli Sposi was painted, Mantua was ruled by the Gonzaga, who maintained Mantua's political autonomy from its much stronger neighbors Milan and Venice by bidding their support out as a mercenary state. By commissioning Mantegna to paint the chamber, Ludovico III Gonzaga, the Marquis of Mantua, sought to give the Gonzaga rule more cultural credibility at a time when other Northern Italian courts such as the Ferrara were commissioning their own “painted chambers”.

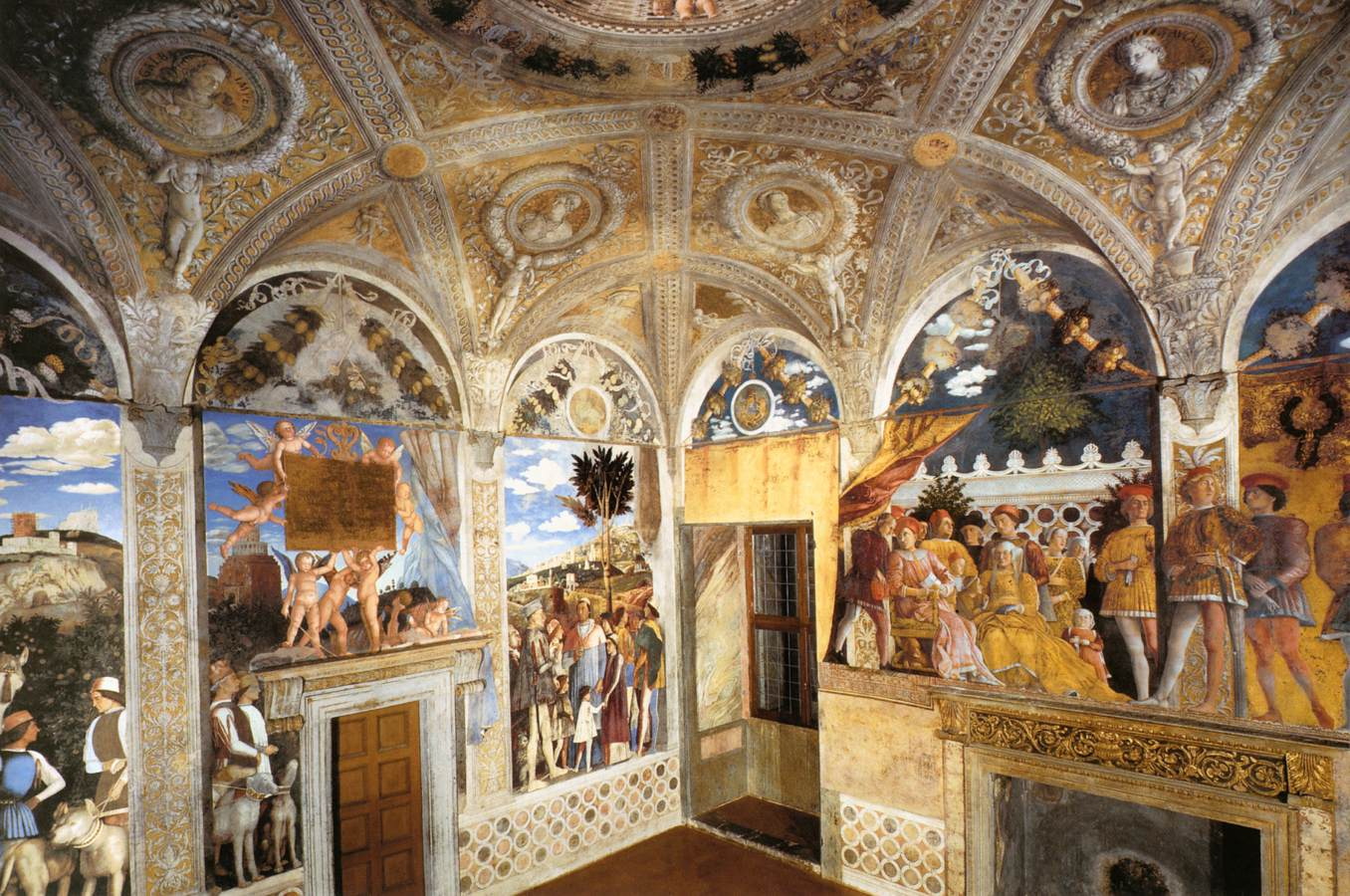
View of the northern and western walls

The Camera is located on the first floor of a northeastern tower in the private section of the Ducal Palace, with windows on the northern and eastern walls, overlooking Lago di Mezzo. This room would have been used for several different private and semi-private functions such as a bed chamber for Ludovico, a gathering area for family and close courtiers, and a reception room for particularly important guests. The semi-private functions of the room helped to create an air of exclusiveness to the Camera degli Sposi that was meant to impress viewer with the wealth and cultural prestige of the Gonzaga without an overt or gaudy display. Before Mantegna began painting, the room was renovated to be as close to a square as possible with the dimensions of roughly eight by eight meters wide and seven meters tall. Original architectural features of the room include the triple vaults on each wall, a fireplace on the north wall, doorways on the west and south walls, and windows on the north and east wall. Painted between 1465 and 1474, the Camera degli Sposi became well known shortly after its completion as a masterpiece in the use of both trompe-l'œil and di sotto in sù.

The effect of Mantegna's illusionistic painting that is suggestive of a classical pavilion is complete with subtle shifts in vantage points that make each fictive element of the illusion seem real to the viewer. On the northern and western walls, framed by fictive marble title on the bottom and a painted curtain rod that runs the full length of each of the walls at the top, are meeting scenes of the Gonzaga and their court in front of sweeping idealized landscapes that appear to be revealed to the viewer by curtains that are drawn or loose in the breeze. The southern and eastern walls appear to be veiled by golden brocaded curtains that mimic the ones that would have been used for the canopy of Ludovico's beds, the hooks for which are still in the ceiling above the southeastern corner of the room. Above these scenes fictive ribbing divides the ceiling onto sections containing faux stucco mandolins of the first eight Caesars of Rome carried by winged putti, and in the center, an oculus that opens on to blue sky with putti that appear as if they are far above the viewer, playing on the balustrade, along with several women looking upon the gathering below them, a few men, and a large potted plant extending into the oculus with a crossbar support.

== North wall ==
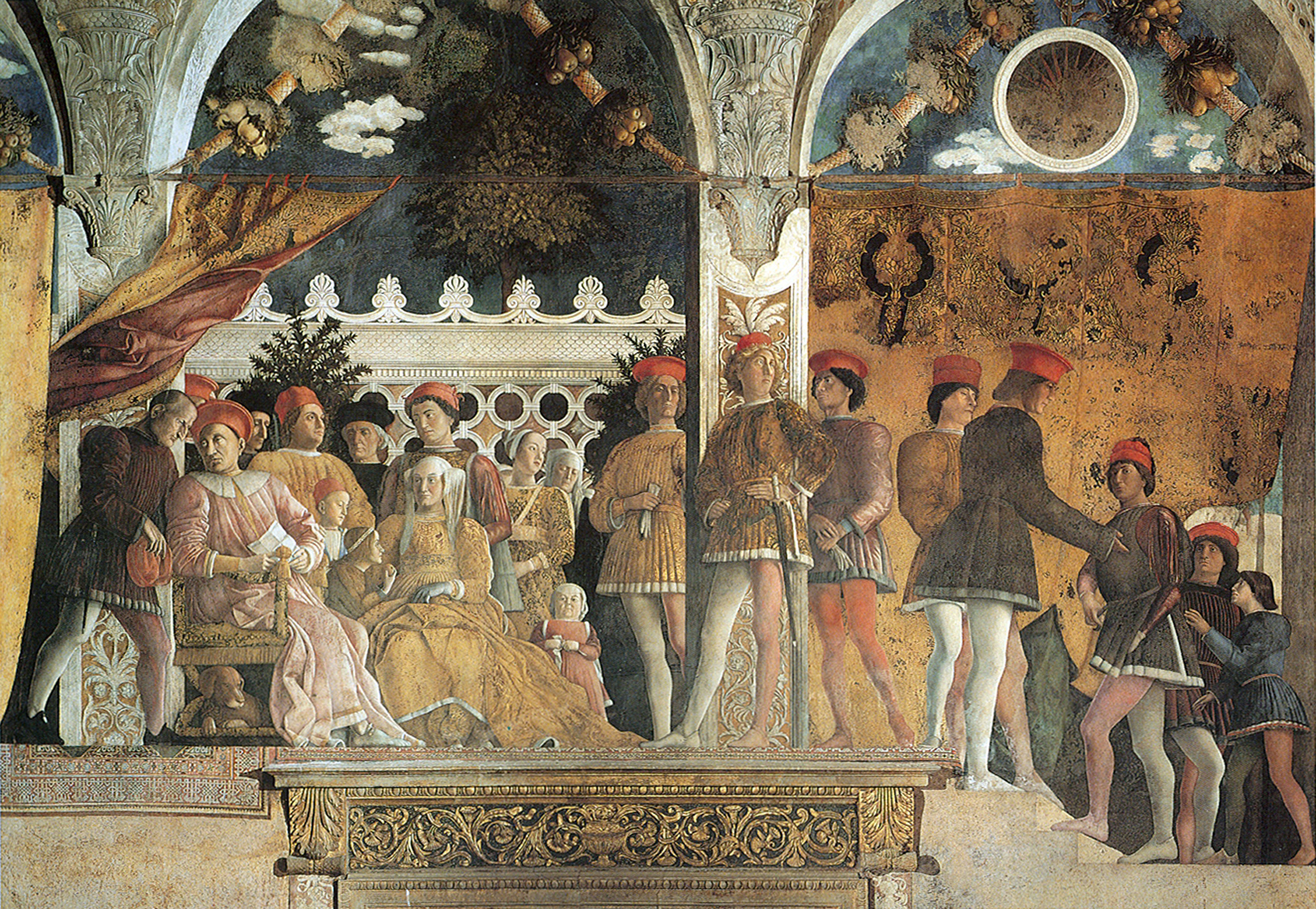
The "Court Scene"

On the north wall over the fireplace, the "Court Scene" shows a family portrait of the Gonzaga. Ludovico Gonzaga is seated, discussing a document with his secretary Marsilio Andreasi. Surrounding him are members of his family and court, including his wife Barbara of Brandenburg, daughters Barbara and Paola, sons Gianfrancesco, Rodolfo, and Ludovichino, and dog Rubino. The whole scene is illusionistically painted as if the figures are resting on the mantel of the fireplace, exhibiting Mantegna's masterful ability to blend fictive and existing architectural elements together in his work. The placement of the subjects on top of the fireplace also puts them above eye level, which, along with their apparent disdain for engaging eye contact with the viewer, has the effect of making the Gonzaga court lofty in both position and intellect. Ludovico often would sit in front of his portrait in the “Court Scene” when he had distinguished visitors, reportedly so that they would take the portrait's non-idealized likeness to Ludovico as a sign that he was trustworthy and that all the other flattering elements of the Camera degli Sposi were true, such as its aim to connect the glory of ancient Rome with Mantua under the Gonzaga.

The “Court Scene" also plays with the idea of access by framing Ludovico as the distant paternal ruler that viewers of the fresco are lucky to have an audience with. Ludovico appears in the painting as informally dressed compared to his family members, in a loose gown, that suggests the semi-private function of the room. From the note in his hand and his consultation of his secretary, it appears to the viewer that they have caught Ludovico in his private routine of governing although there have been arguments made that this is a particular moment in time, either the receipt of a letter from Francesco Sforza delivering word that he is ill or the commissioning document for the Camera degli Sposi. In the right third of fresco, courtiers wait on the steps for their turn to get an audience with Ludovico. The fictive curtain suggests the brevity of the viewer's own audience with Ludovico by “uncovering” the scene as it is blown in the wind.

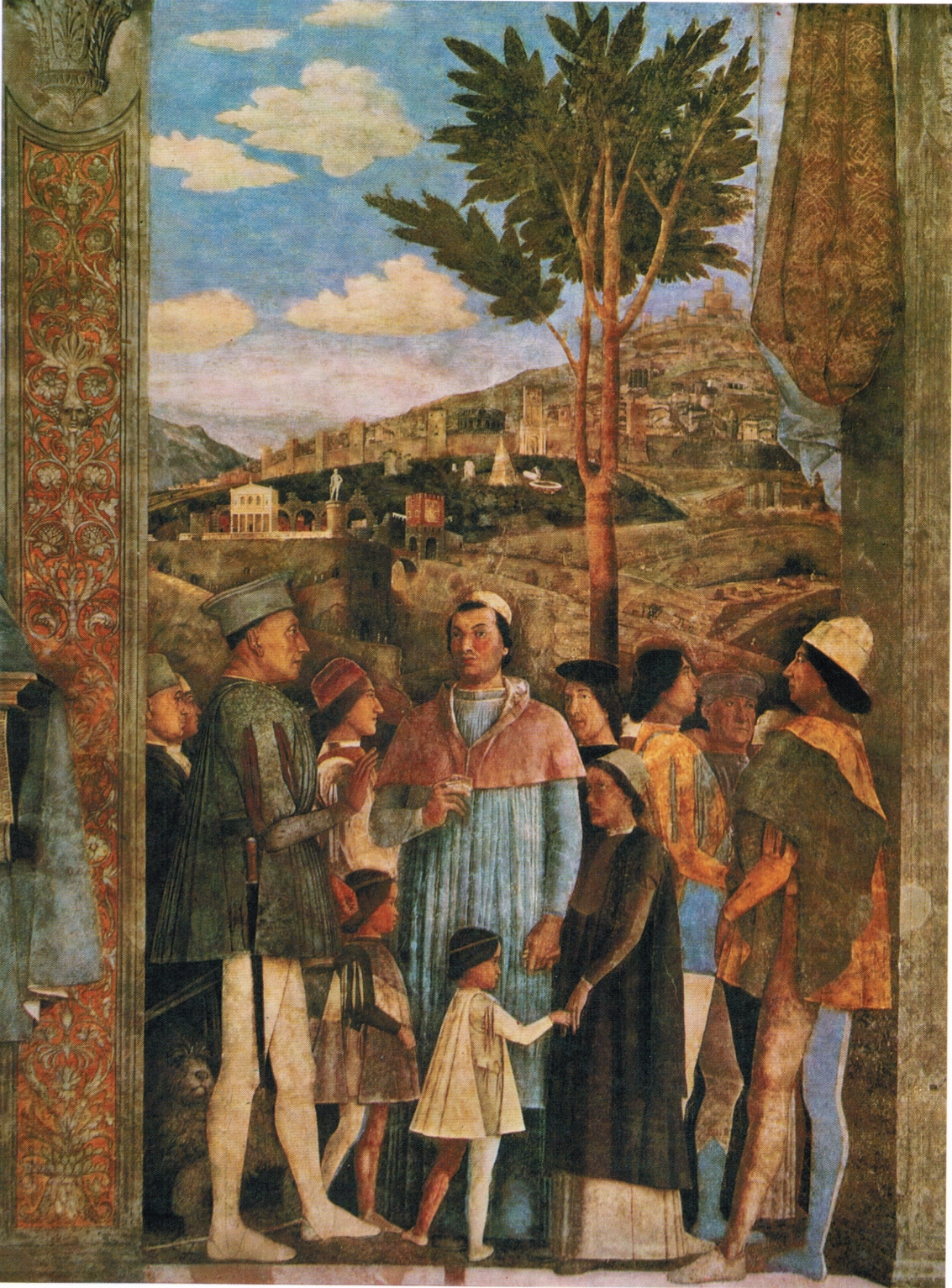
The "Meeting Scene"

== West wall ==
On the west wall is the "Meeting scene". This fresco shows Ludovico speaking with his second son Francesco Gonzaga, who ten days prior had become a cardinal in the Roman Catholic Church and who is holding the hand of his younger brother Lodovico, pronotary of the Catholic Church. They are accompanied by Federico I Gonzaga's children, Francesco and Sigismondo. Among those surrounding them are the Holy Roman Emperor Frederick III, and Christian I, king of Denmark. While this meeting between the Gonzaga family and these noteworthy political leaders never took place, Mantegna's depiction of it does shed light on the political aspirations of the Gonzaga, who wanted to seem at the same time, both good feudal servants and equals of the upper tier of the political elite (as evidenced by the emperor's and king's lack of visual prominence over the Gonzaga). Notably, this ideal political meeting excludes the primary employer of Mantua's military forces, Duke Galeazzo Maria Sforza, showing again aspirations by Gonzaga for not being beholden to or less than other political leaders. In the landscape that serves as a backdrop to this meeting rises an imaginary Roman city branded with the Gonzaga coat of arms, another allusion to Mantua's comparable splendor under Gonzaga rule.

== Ceiling ==
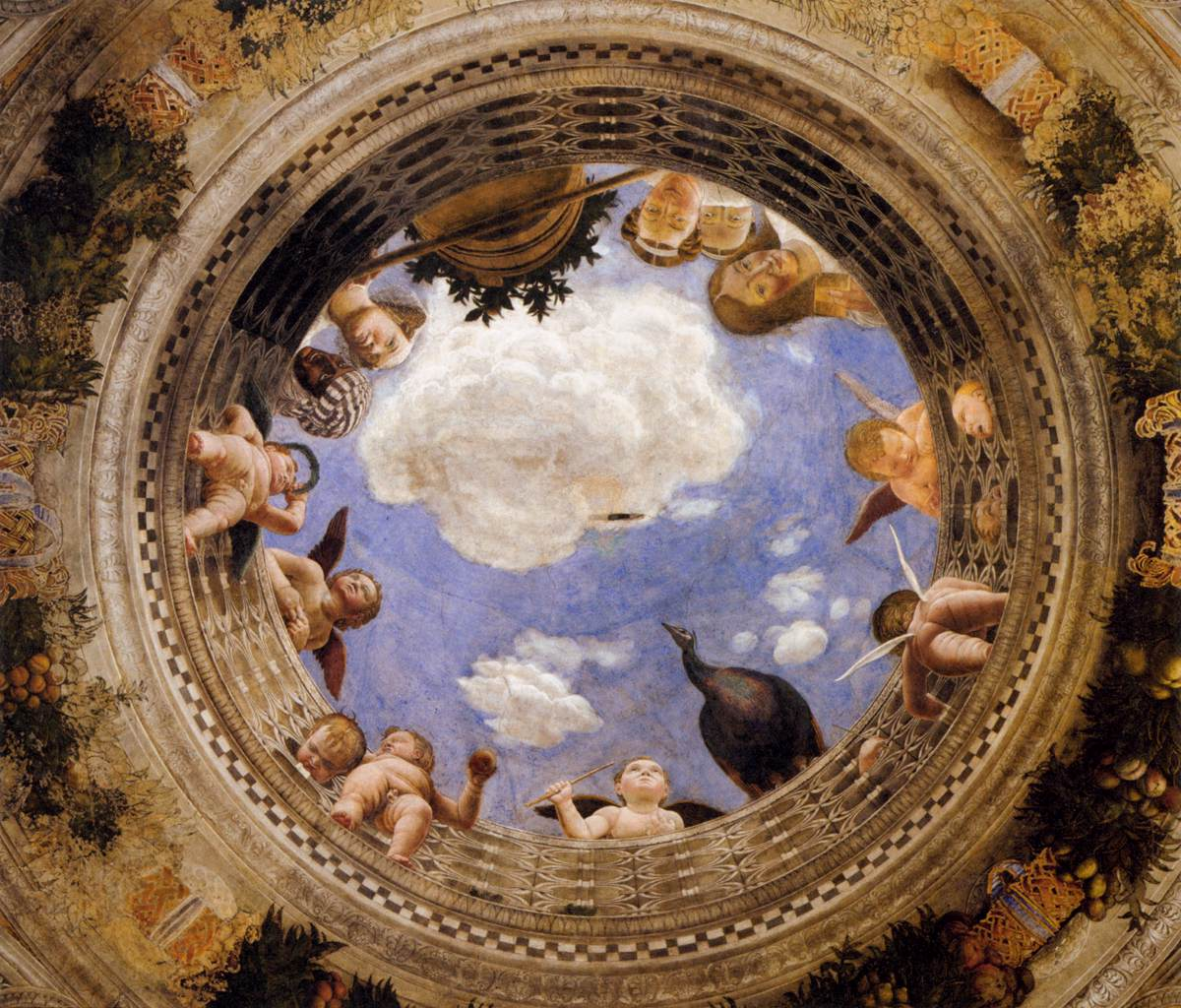
The oculus

From the fictive columns that separate the different scenes on the walls (capped with real stone corbels), rise illusionistic ribs embossed with scroll work that divides the ceiling into sections. In the corbeled sections between the vaults are illusionistic relief carvings from the lives of Arion, Orpheus, and Hercules set in painted gold mosaic that harken back to antiquity. Above them are the first eight Roman emperors in medallions held aloft by putti, all depicted in grisaille on gold lit from below in order to achieve the effect of real stucco reliefs. The implied connection between the glory of Italy's Roman past and the Gonzaga's Mantua through the classical references of the ceiling, ennobles the Gonzaga as both a military and learned might that is comparable to the Roman Empire.

Mantegna's playful ceiling presents an oculus that fictively opens into a blue sky, with foreshortened putti playfully frolicking around a balustrade painted in di sotto in sù to seem as if they occupy real space on the roof above. Breaking with the figures from the scenes below, the courtiers who look down from over the balustrade seem directly aware of the viewer's presence. The precarious position of the planter above, as it rests uneasily on a stray beam, suggests that looking up at the figures could leave the viewer humiliated at the expense of the courtiers’ enjoyment. Mantegna's exploration of how paintings or decorations could respond to the presence of the viewer was a new idea in Renaissance Italy that would be explored by other artists. The Camera degli Sposi's illusionistic ceiling also set a new standard for di sotto in sù ceiling paintings that would go on to inspire the ceiling paintings of Correggio and other Baroque painters.
