= Portrait of Federico II Gonzaga =

c. 1529 painting by Titian

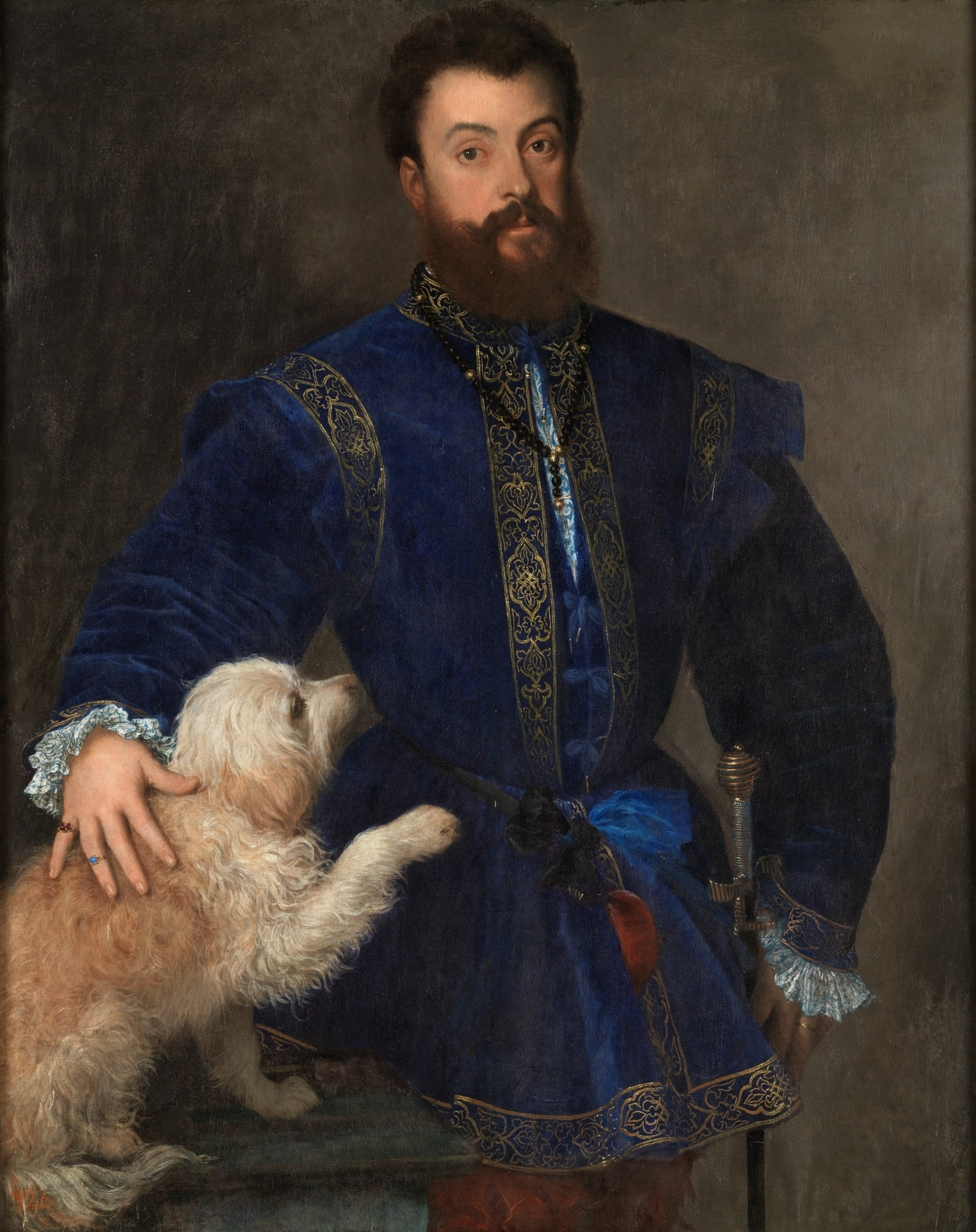
- Artist: Titian
- Year: c. 1529
- Medium: Oil on canvas
- Dimensions: 125 cm × 99 cm (49 in × 39 in)
- Location: Museo del Prado, Madrid

Portrait of Federico II Gonzaga (c. 1529) is a painting by Titian, who signed it Ticianus f.. Today in the Museo del Prado, Madrid, it portrays Federico II, Duke of Mantua who married in 1529; the portrait may have been commissioned for the occasion. The dog, a Maltese, is a symbol of faithfulness.

== Description ==
Federico II Gonzaga is portrayed at half-length, standing against a dark neutral background, with one hand on his sword and the other stroking a Maltese dog, as if to underline his dual nature: friendly with those who are faithful to him, still ready to fight his enemies. The dog was usually used in female portraits and in this case is a symbol of loyalty.

He wears a long beard, according to the 16th-century fashion, while his gaze is attentive and intelligent. He wears a sumptuous tunic with edges decorated with embroidered inserts, tight at the waist and wide at the hips. Around his neck he wears a necklace of black pearls, with a crucifix that testifies his faith, a notation that underlined his redemption from a stormy past.

== Provenance ==
The work is mentioned in a 1666 inventory of the Royal Alcázar of Madrid, coming from the collection of the Marquess of Leganés. Previous owners included Charles I of England, who purchased many paintings from the Gonzaga collection.

== See also ==
- List of works by Titian
- Portrait of Francesco Gonzaga

== Bibliography ==
- Valcanover, Francesco (1969). L'opera completa di Tiziano. Milan: Rizzoli.
