= Giovanni Boccaccio =

Italian author and poet (1313–1375)

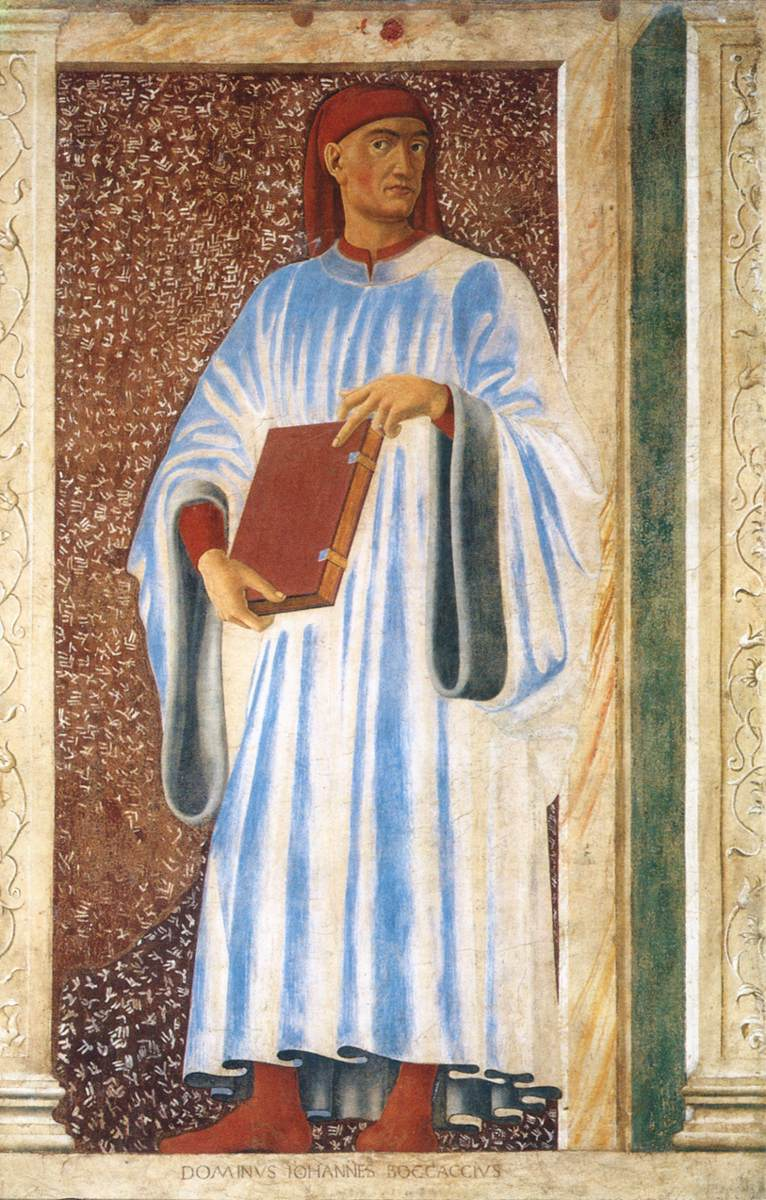
- Posthumous portrait by Andrea del Castagno, c. 1450
- Born: 16 June 1313; Certaldo, Republic of Florence
- Died: 21 December 1375 (aged 62); Certaldo, Republic of Florence
- Occupations: Writer, poet
- Parent: Boccaccino de Chellino (father)
- Writing career
- Language: Italian (Tuscan and Florentine dialect); Latin
- Years active: 1341–1375
- Period: Early Renaissance
- Genres: Epic poem; lyric poem; sonnet; pastoral; novella; short story; literary criticism; biography; correspondence
- Notable work: The Decameron
- Movement: Italian Renaissance

Giovanni Boccaccio (Note: English: UK: /bəˈkætʃioʊ/ bə-KATCH-ee-oh, US: /boʊˈkɑːtʃ(i)oʊ, bəˈ-/ boh-KAH-ch(ee)oh, bə-; Italian: [dʒoˈvanni bokˈkattʃo].) (16 June 1313 – 21 December 1375) was an Italian writer, poet, correspondent of Petrarch, and an important Renaissance humanist. Born in the town of Certaldo, he gained sufficient notoriety to be known simply as "the Certaldese". Boccaccio ranked among the most important figures in the European literary panorama of the fourteenth century. Some scholars (including Vittore Branca) define him as the greatest European prose writer of his time, a versatile writer who amalgamated different literary trends and genres, making them converge in original works, thanks to a creative activity exercised under the banner of experimentalism.

His most notable works are The Decameron, a collection of short stories, and On Famous Women. The Decameron became a determining element for the Italian literary tradition, especially after Pietro Bembo elevated the Boccaccian style to a model of Italian prose in the sixteenth century. Boccaccio wrote his imaginative literature mostly in Tuscan vernacular, as well as other works in Latin, and is particularly noted for his realistic dialogue that differed from that of his contemporaries, medieval writers who usually followed formulaic models for character and plot. The influence of Boccaccio's works was not limited to the Italian cultural scene, but extended to the rest of Europe, exerting influence on authors such as Geoffrey Chaucer, a key figure in English literature, and the later writers Miguel de Cervantes, Lope de Vega, and classical theatre in Spain.

Boccaccio is considered one of the "Three Crowns" of Italian literature along with Dante Alighieri and Petrarch. He is remembered for being one of the precursors of humanism, of which he helped lay the foundations in the city of Florence, in conjunction with the activity of his friend and teacher, Petrarch. He was the one who initiated Dante's criticism and philology: Boccaccio devoted himself to copying codices of the Divine Comedy and was a promoter of Dante's work and figure.

In the twentieth century, Boccaccio was the subject of critical-philological studies by Vittore Branca and Giuseppe Billanovich, and his Decameron was transposed to the big screen by the director and writer Pier Paolo Pasolini.

== Biography ==
=== Childhood and youth, 1313–1330 ===
The details of Boccaccio's birth are uncertain. He was born in Florence or in a village near Certaldo where his family was from. He was the son of Florentine merchant Boccaccino di Chellino and an unknown woman; he was likely born out of wedlock. Boccaccio's stepmother was called Margherita de' Mardoli.

Boccaccio grew up in Florence. His father worked for the Compagnia dei Bardi and, in the 1320s, married Margherita dei Mardoli, who was of a well-to-do family. Boccaccio may have been tutored by Giovanni Mazzuoli and received from him an early introduction to the works of Dante. In 1326, his father was appointed head of a bank and moved with his family to Naples. Boccaccio was an apprentice at the bank, but disliked the banking profession. He persuaded his father to let him study law at the Studium (the present-day University of Naples), where he studied canon law for the next six years. He also pursued his interest in scientific and literary studies.

His father introduced him to the Neapolitan nobility and the French-influenced court of Robert the Wise (the king of Naples) in the 1330s. Boccaccio became a friend of fellow Florentine Niccolò Acciaioli, and benefited from Acciaioli's influence with Catherine of Valois-Courtenay, widow of Philip I of Taranto. Acciaioli later became a counselor to Queen Joanna I of Naples and, eventually, became her Grand Seneschal.

It seems that Boccaccio enjoyed law no more than banking, but his studies allowed him the opportunity to study widely and make good contacts with fellow scholars. His early influences included Paolo da Perugia (a curator and author of a collection of myths called the Collectiones), humanists Barbato da Sulmona and Giovanni Barrili, and theologian Dionigi di Borgo San Sepolcro.

=== Adult years ===
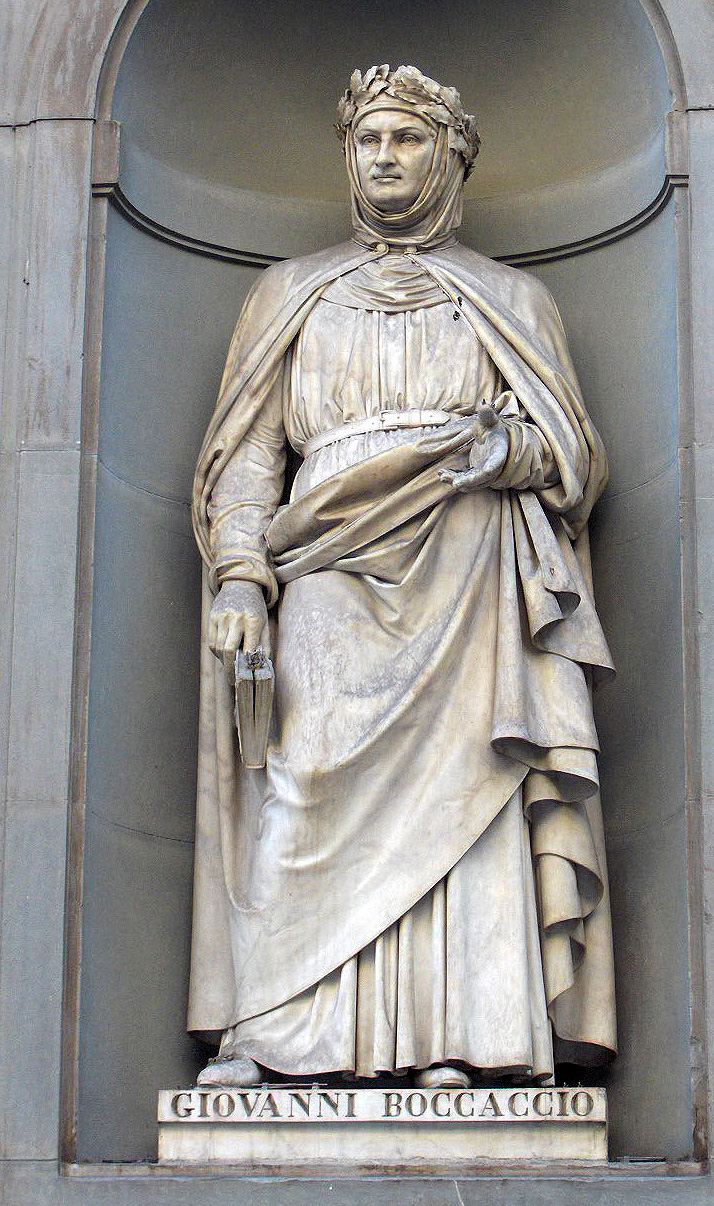
1845 statue of Boccaccio by Fantacchiotti in Uffizi Gallery

In Naples, Boccaccio began what he considered his true vocation of poetry. Works produced in this period include Il Filostrato and Teseida (the sources for Chaucer's Troilus and Criseyde and The Knight's Tale, respectively), The Filocolo (a prose version of an existing French romance), and La caccia di Diana (a poem in terza rima listing Neapolitan women). The period featured considerable formal innovation, including possibly the introduction of the Sicilian octave, where it influenced Petrarch.

Boccaccio returned to Florence in early 1341, avoiding the plague of 1340 in that city, but also missing the visit of Petrarch to Naples in 1341. He had left Naples due to tensions between the Angevin king and Florence. His father had returned to Florence in 1338, where he had gone bankrupt. His mother may have died shortly afterward. Boccaccio continued to work, although dissatisfied with his return to Florence, producing Comedia delle ninfe fiorentine in 1341 (also known as Ameto), a mix of prose and poems, completing the fifty-canto allegorical poem Amorosa visione in 1342, and The Elegy of Lady Fiammetta in 1343. The pastoral piece "Ninfale fiesolano" probably dates from this time, also. In 1343, Boccaccio's father remarried, to Bice del Bostichi. The other children by his father's first marriage had all died, but his father had another son named Iacopo, who was born in 1344.

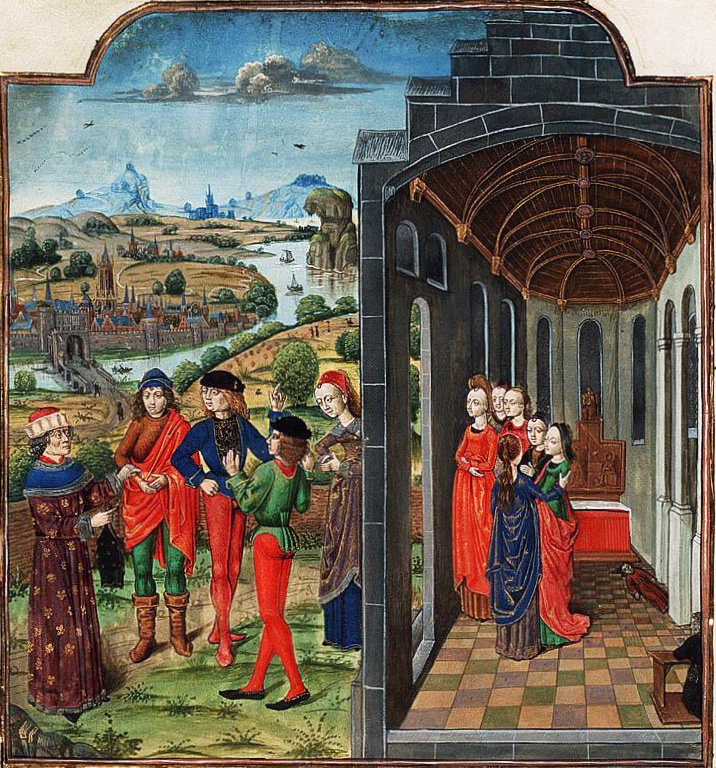
Boccaccio and others fleeing the plague; illumination of a French edition of the Decamerone (c. 1485)

In Florence, the overthrow of Walter of Brienne brought about the government of popolo minuto ("small people", workers). It diminished the influence of the nobility and the wealthier merchant classes and contributed to the relative decline of Florence. The city was hurt further in 1348 by the Black Death, which killed some three-quarters of the city population and was later represented in Boccaccio's work The Decameron.

From 1347, Boccaccio spent much time in Ravenna, seeking new patronage and, despite his claims, it is not certain whether he was present in plague-ravaged Florence. His stepmother died during the epidemic and his father was closely associated with the government efforts as minister of supply in the city. His father died in 1349 and Boccaccio was forced into a more active role as head of the family.

Boccaccio began work on The Decameron around 1349. It is probable that the structures of many of the tales date from earlier in his career, but the choice of a hundred tales and the frame-story lieta brigata of three men and seven women dates from this time. The work was largely complete by 1352. It was Boccaccio's final effort in literature and one of his last works in Tuscan vernacular; the only other substantial work was Corbaccio (dated to either 1355 or 1365). Boccaccio revised and rewrote The Decameron in 1370–1371. This manuscript has survived to the present day.

From 1350, Boccaccio became closely involved with Italian humanism (although less of a scholar) and also with the Florentine government. His first official mission was to Romagna in late 1350. He revisited that city-state twice and also was sent to Brandenburg, Milan, and Avignon. He also pushed for the study of Greek, housing Leontius Pilatus, and encouraging his tentative translations of works by Homer, Euripides, and Aristotle. In these years, he also took minor orders.

In October 1350, he was delegated to greet Francesco Petrarch as he entered Florence and also to have Petrarch as a guest at Boccaccio's home, during his stay. The meeting between the two was extremely fruitful and they were friends from then on, Boccaccio calling Petrarch his teacher and magister. Petrarch at that time encouraged Boccaccio to study classical Greek and Latin literature. They met again in Padua in 1351, Boccaccio on an official mission to invite Petrarch to take a chair at the university in Florence. Although unsuccessful, the discussions between the two were instrumental in Boccaccio writing the Genealogia deorum gentilium; the first edition was completed in 1360 and this remained one of the key reference works on classical mythology for more than 400 years. It served as an extended defence for the studies of ancient literature and thought. Despite the Pagan beliefs at its core, Boccaccio believed that much could be learned from antiquity. Thus, he challenged the arguments of clerical intellectuals who wanted to limit access to classical sources to prevent any moral harm to Christian readers. The revival of classical antiquity became a foundation of the Renaissance, and his defence of the importance of ancient literature was an essential requirement for its development. The discussions also formalized Boccaccio's poetic ideas. Certain sources also see a conversion of Boccaccio by Petrarch from the open humanist of the Decameron to a more ascetic style, closer to the dominant fourteenth-century ethos. For example, he followed Petrarch (and Dante) in the unsuccessful championing of an archaic and deeply allusive form of Latin poetry. In 1359, following a meeting with Pope Innocent VI and further meetings with Petrarch, it is probable that Boccaccio took some kind of religious mantle. There is a persistent (but unsupported) tale that he repudiated his earlier works as profane in 1362, including The Decameron.

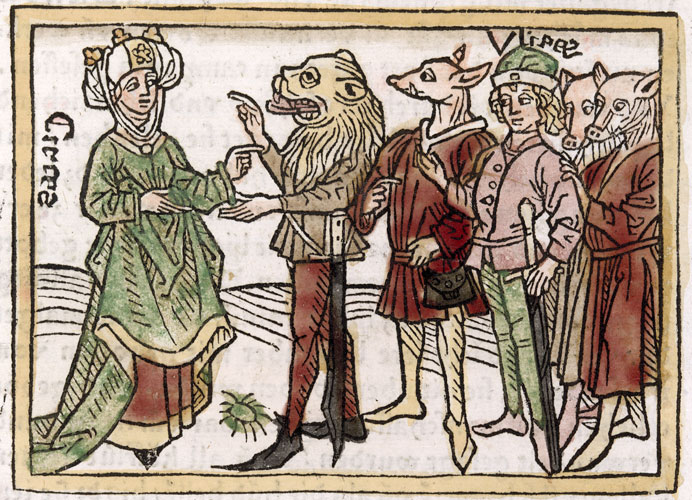
Circes: illustration of one of the women featured in the 1374 biographies of 106 famous women, De Claris Mulieribus, by Boccaccio – from a German translation of 1541

In 1360, Boccaccio began work on De mulieribus claris ("On famous women"), a book offering biographies of 106 famous women, that he completed in 1374. This publication was illustrated and included depictions of women he featured, some as they were performing their renown skills in his contemporary community, such as fine art painting.

A number of Boccaccio's close friends and other acquaintances were executed or exiled in the purge following a failed coup in 1361; although not directly linked to the conspiracy, in that year Boccaccio left Florence to reside in Certaldo, where he became less involved in government affairs. He did not undertake further missions for Florence until 1365, and he travelled to Naples and then on to Padua and Venice, where he met up with Petrarch in grand style at Palazzo Molina, Petrarch's residence as well as the location of Petrarch's library. Boccaccio later returned to Certaldo; he met Petrarch only one more time, in 1368, again in Padua. Upon hearing of the death of Petrarch (19 July 1374), he wrote a commemorative poem, including it in his collection of lyric poems, the Rime.

He returned to work for the Florentine government in 1365, undertaking a mission to Pope Urban V. The papacy returned to Rome from Avignon in 1367, and Boccaccio was again sent to Urban, offering congratulations. He also undertook diplomatic missions to Venice and Naples.

Of his later works, the moralistic biographies gathered as De casibus virorum illustrium (1355–74) and De mulieribus claris (1361–1375) were the most significant. Other works include a dictionary of geographical allusions in classical literature, De montibus, silvis, fontibus, lacubus, fluminibus, stagnis seu paludibus, et de nominibus maris liber. He gave a series of lectures on Dante at the Santo Stefano church in 1373 and these resulted in his final major work, the detailed Esposizioni sopra la Commedia di Dante. Boccaccio and Petrarch were also two of the most educated people in early Renaissance regarding the field of archaeology.

Petrarch had offered to purchase Boccaccio's library, so that it would become part of Petrarch's library. However, upon Boccaccio's death, his entire collection was given to the monastery of Santo Spirito, in Florence, where it still resides.

Boccaccio's final years were troubled by illnesses, some relating to obesity and what often is described as dropsy, severe edema that would be described today as congestive heart failure. He died on 21 December 1375 in Certaldo, where he is buried.

== Works ==
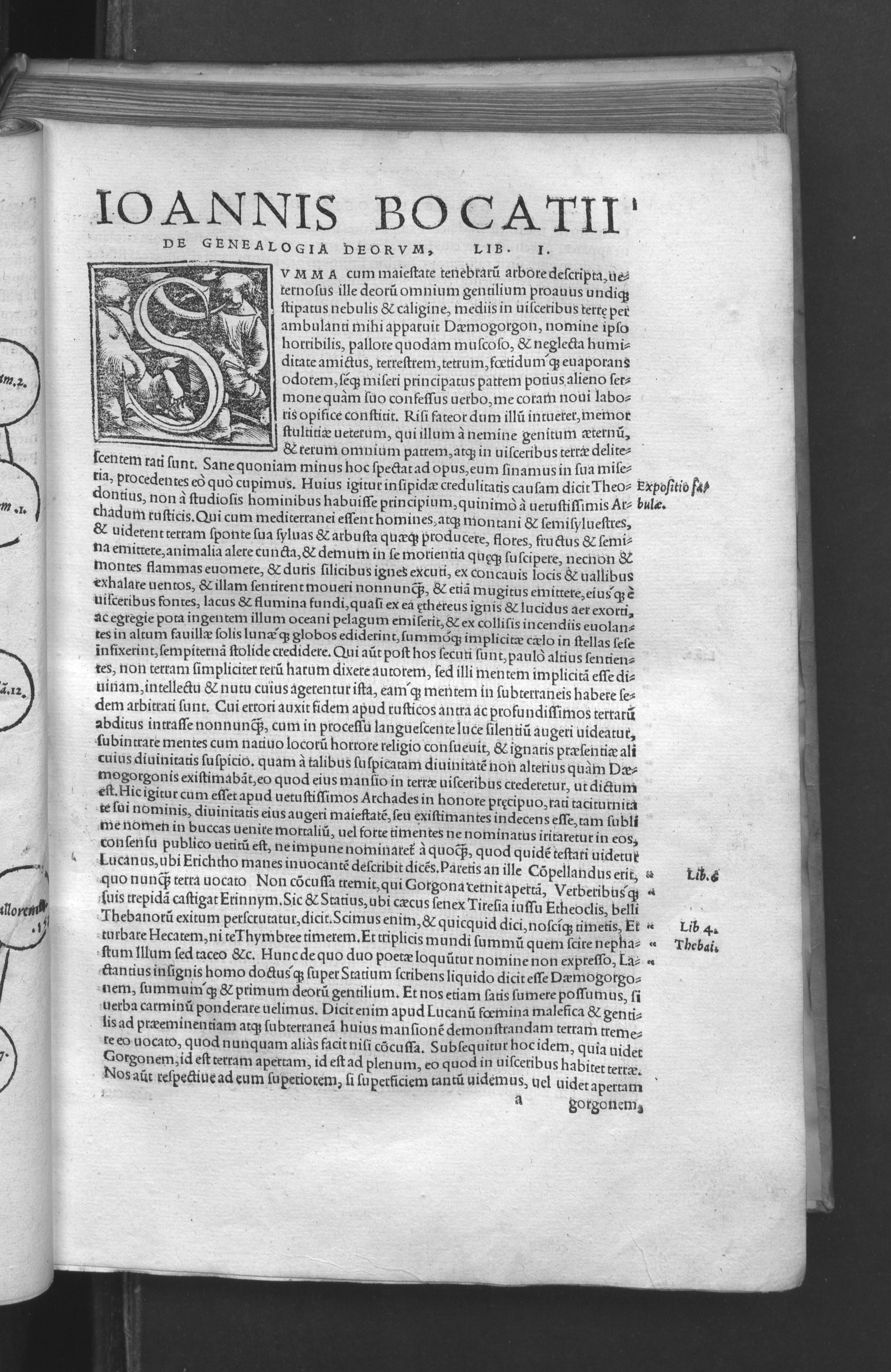
Genealogia deorum gentilium, 1532

Alphabetical listing of selected works

- Amorosa visione (1342)
- Buccolicum carmen (1367–1369)
- Caccia di Diana (1334–1337)
- Comedia delle ninfe fiorentine (Ninfale d'Ameto, 1341–1342)
- Corbaccio (around 1365, this date is disputed)
- De Canaria (within 1341–1345)
- De Casibus Virorum Illustrium (c. 1360, revised through early 1373). Facsimile of 1620 Paris ed., 1962, Scholars' Facsimiles & Reprints, ISBN 978-0-8201-1005-9.
- De mulieribus claris (1361, revised up to 1375)
- The Decameron (1349–52, revised 1370–1371)
- Elegia di Madonna Fiammetta (1343–1344)
- Esposizioni sopra la Comedia di Dante (1373–1374)
- Filocolo (1336–1339)
- Filostrato (1335 or 1340)
- Genealogia deorum gentilium libri (1360, revised up to 1374)
- Ninfale fiesolano (within 1344–46, this date is disputed)
- Rime (finished 1374)
- Teseida delle nozze di Emilia (before 1341)
- Trattatello in laude di Dante (1357, title revised to De origine vita studiis et moribus viri clarissimi Dantis Aligerii florentini poetae illustris et de operibus compositis ab eodem)
- Zibaldone Magliabechiano (within 1351–1356)

See Consoli's bibliography for an exhaustive listing.

== See also ==
- Influence of Italian humanism on Chaucer

== Sources ==
- Bartlett, Kenneth R. (1992). "Florence in the Renaissance". The Civilization of the Italian Renaissance: A Sourcebook. Lexington, Mass.: D.C. Heath. ISBN 0-669-20900-7.
- Blanc, Ludwig G. (1844). "Die Eigennamen" [The proper names]. Grammatik der italienischen Sprache [Italian language grammar] (in German). Halle: Carl August Schwetschke und Sohn.
- Bosco, Umberto (25 July 2024). "Giovanni Boccaccio". Encyclopædia Britannica.
- Branca, Vittore (1977). Giovanni Boccaccio: profilo biografico (in Italian). G. C. Sansoni. ISBN 978-88-383-6502-7.
- Cataldi, Pietro; Donnarumma, Raffaele; Luperini, Romano; Marchese, Franco; Marchiani, Lidia (1998). La scrittura e l'interpretazione : Storia e antologia della letteratura italiana nel quadro della civiltà europea [Writing and interpretation: History and anthology of Italian literature in the framework of European civilization.] (in Italian). Vol. 1st. Palermo: Palumbo. ISBN 88-8020-225-1.
- Çoban, R. V. (2020). The Manzikert Battle and Sultan Alp Arslan with European Perspective in the 15st Century in the Miniatures of Giovanni Boccaccio's "De Casibus Virorum Illustrium"s 226 and 232. French Manuscripts in Bibliothèque Nationale de France. S. Karakaya ve V. Baydar (Ed.), in 2nd International Muş Symposium Articles Book (pp. 48–64). Muş: Muş Alparslan University. Source
- Patrick, James A.(2007). Renaissance And Reformation. Marshall Cavendish Corp. ISBN 9780761476504.
