= Corbaccio =

1355 book by Giovanni Boccaccio

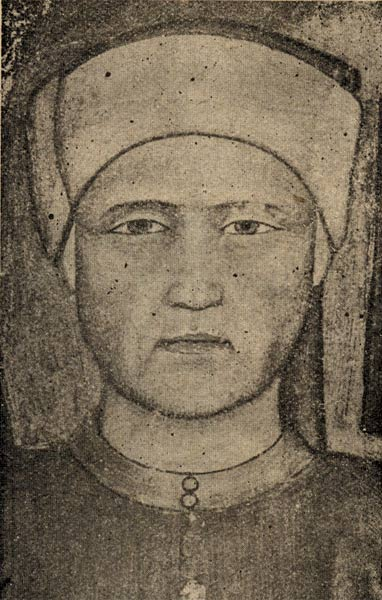
Author Giovanni Boccaccio

Il Corbaccio, or "The Crow", is an Italian literary work by Giovanni Boccaccio, traditionally dated c. 1355.

== Plot ==
The work is narrated in the first person and opens with a justification (it is not a real prologue) in which the author declares that he wishes his narrative to be a consolation to those who read it, such as he found thanks to God and the intercession of Our Lady.

The protagonist, desperate because of the unreturned love of a widow, calls on Death, falls asleep and dreams. In his dream appears a man who declares himself to be the deceased husband of the widow, who says he has come, sent by God and through the intercession of Our Lady, to free him from the labyrinth of love into which he has fallen.

The protagonist tells the story of his love to the spirit, who warns him against women who, with their lust, endanger men.

The spirit then begins to tell him of his own experiences with the woman, drawing attention to all of her shortcomings. After hearing the story told by the spirit, the protagonist declares himself convinced and says that he wants to remedy his mistake. The spirit therefore invites him to revenge himself by using his skills as a writer to "unmask" the true nature of women. Still in the dream, the protagonist promises to do so and when he wakes up, in his room he finds himself healed of his troubles. The author concludes his work by warning the young against "female wickedness".

== Background ==
Boccaccio is most famous as the author of The Decameron (completed c. 1351–2), another work of ambiguous interpretation regarding the dolce stil novo and the antifeminist counter argument. Regarding Il Corbaccio, whether the novel's theme of misogyny is a detailed study of the attitude or a direct misogynistic expression of the author has long been a subject of debate.

Scholars who consider the text to be autobiographical base their interpretation on connecting aspects of the text to events in the author's life. The opposing view accepts the author's own reference to the work as a "trattato", or a philosophical treatment. As stated by scholar Anthony K. Cassell, "the formal elements of the treatise are part of a wide artistic tradition and contest autobiographical intention and interpretation". The work is regarded by some scholars as late medieval in character, others as early renaissance.

== See also ==
- Unrequited love
- Elegia di Madonna Fiammetta
