= Rodolfo Gonzaga =

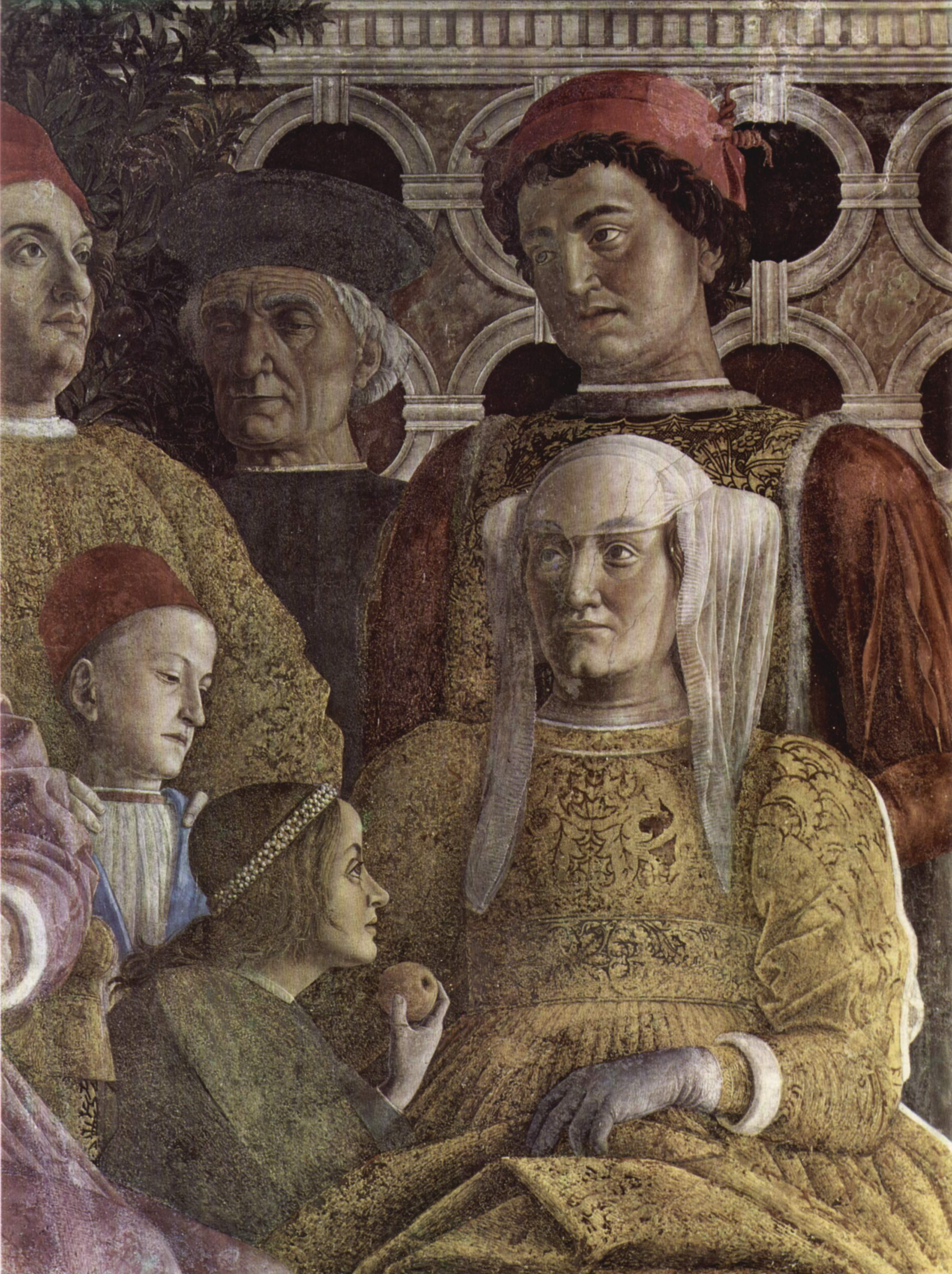
Rodolfo Gonzaga behind his mother in a painting by Andrea Mantegna in the Camera degli Sposi in Mantua.

Rodolfo Gonzaga (18 April 1452 in Mantua – 6 July 1495 in Fornovo) was an Italian condottiero. He was the son of Ludovico III Gonzaga and Barbara of Brandenburg.

He died at the Battle of Fornovo, where he commanded a contingent of men fighting against King Charles VIII of France.

== Family ==
Rodolfo first married Antonia Malatesta (1451-1483) on 11 January 1481. The marriage remained childless.

Rodolfo married secondly Caterina Pico (1454-1501) in 1484. With Caterina he had six children:

- Paola Gonzaga (born 1486 in Mantua; died May 30, 1519 in Milan), married 1501 Gian Niccolò Trivulzio (* 1479; † 1512), Count of Musocco, son of Gian Giacomo Trivulzio
- Gianfrancesco Gonzaga (born 2 February 1488 in Luzzara; died 18 December 1524), Lord of Luzzara, married Laura Pallavicino, daughter of Galeazzo Pallavicino Marchese of Busseto
- Lucrezia Gonzaga (born 30 September 1490; died young)
- Barbara Gonzaga (born 30 September 1490; died young)
- Giulia Gonzaga (* March 16, 1493 - † November 25, 1544), nun in Mantua
- Luigi Alessandro Gonzaga (born 20 April 1494 in Luzzara; died 19 July 1549 in Castel Goffredo) Marquis of Castiglione, Castel Goffredo and Solferino, married 1540 Caterina Anguissola († December 13, 1550), daughter of Gian Giacomo Anguissola, Count di Piacenza

== Sources ==
- Antenhofer, Christina (2001). "From Local Signori to European High Nobility: The Gonzaga Family Networks in the Fifteenth Century". In Johnson, Christopher H.; Sabean, David Warren; Teuscher, Simon; Trivellato, Francesca (eds.). Transregional and Transnational Families in Europe and Beyond: Experiences. Berghahn books. ISBN 9780857451842.
- Jones, P.J. (2005). The Malatesta of Rimini and the Papal State. Cambridge University Press. ISBN 9780521023641.
- Mallett, Michael E.; Hale, J.R. (1984). The Military Organization of a Renaissance State: Venice c.1400 to 1617. Cambridge University Press. ISBN 978-0-521-03247-6.
