= Dorotea Gonzaga =

Italian noblewoman (1449–1467)

Dorotea Gonzaga (6 December 1449 – 20 April 1467) was an Italian noblewoman and Princess of Mantua. She was the daughter of Ludovico III Gonzaga, Marquess of Mantua and Barbara of Brandenburg.

In 1466, Dorotea was about to marry Galeazzo Maria Sforza, but the engagement was called off and she died in 1467. Her former fiancé married Bona of Savoy.

== Life ==
Her maternal grandparents were John, Margrave of Brandenburg-Kulmbach, and Barbara of Saxe-Wittenberg. Dorotea's mother Barbara was considered one of the most well-educated women in Renaissance Italy. Dorotea therefore grew up in a milieu where scholarly pursuits and arts and culture were highly valued.

Little is known about Dorotea's education but it is probable that considering her own mother's education that it was a thorough one, and that it mirrored that of her younger sister Barbara who was taught to read and write Italian and German and also the classic languages Latin and Greek as well as history and literature.

Dorotea's father had long been eager to make a marriage alliance with the powerful Sforzas of Milan. Dorotea was engaged to Galeazzo after it was revealed that the originally intended bride, her older sister Susanna, was hunchbacked. It was then decided to replace the name of Susanna in the marriage contracts with that of Dorotea. Though it was noted that Dorotea's shoulders were uneven it was not deemed such a great defect as to stop the marriage negotiations.

Dorotea's father would however not allow his daughter to be inspected naked for any deformity as demanded by the Milanese envoys. It was rumored that she, similarly to her older sister had a spinal deformity. Eventually a compromise was reached with Dorotea performing in front of the Milanese ambassadors wearing only a thin gown.

But Galeazzo Maria's father Francesco I Sforza was no longer interested in an alliance with Mantua and wanted to break the betrothal in order to instead secure a French royal match for his son. Galeazzo Maria was however adamant that he wanted to marry Dorotea. After communication between the Gonzagas and the Sforzas broke down, despite the best efforts of both Galeazzo Maria and his mother Bianca Visconti the betrothal was cancelled.

It was not until after the death of Galeazzo Marias father in 1466 that he was able to renew his suit for Dorotea. But as the marriage contract were being drawn up, Dorotea became ill with a fever and died just days before the wedding on the 20 April 1467. This sparked rumors that Galeazzo Maria had poisoned her to eliminate his obligations to marry her.

== Sources ==
- Bartlett, Kenneth R. (2013). A Short History of the Italian Renaissance. University of Toronto Press.
- Antenhofer, Christina (2011). "From Local "Signori" to European High Nobility: The Gonzaga Family Networks in the Fifteenth Century". In Johnson, Christopher H.; Teuscher, Simon; Sabean, David Warren; Trivellato, Francesca (eds.). Transregional and Transnational Families in Europe and Beyond: Experiences Since the Middle Ages. Berghahn Books. pp. 55–74.

Preceded by Bianca Maria Visconti	Duchess of Milan; 1466–1468	Succeeded by Bona of Savoy
