= Barbara of Brandenburg, Marquise of Mantua =

Marchioness consort of Mantua

Barbara of Brandenburg
- Marchioness of Mantua
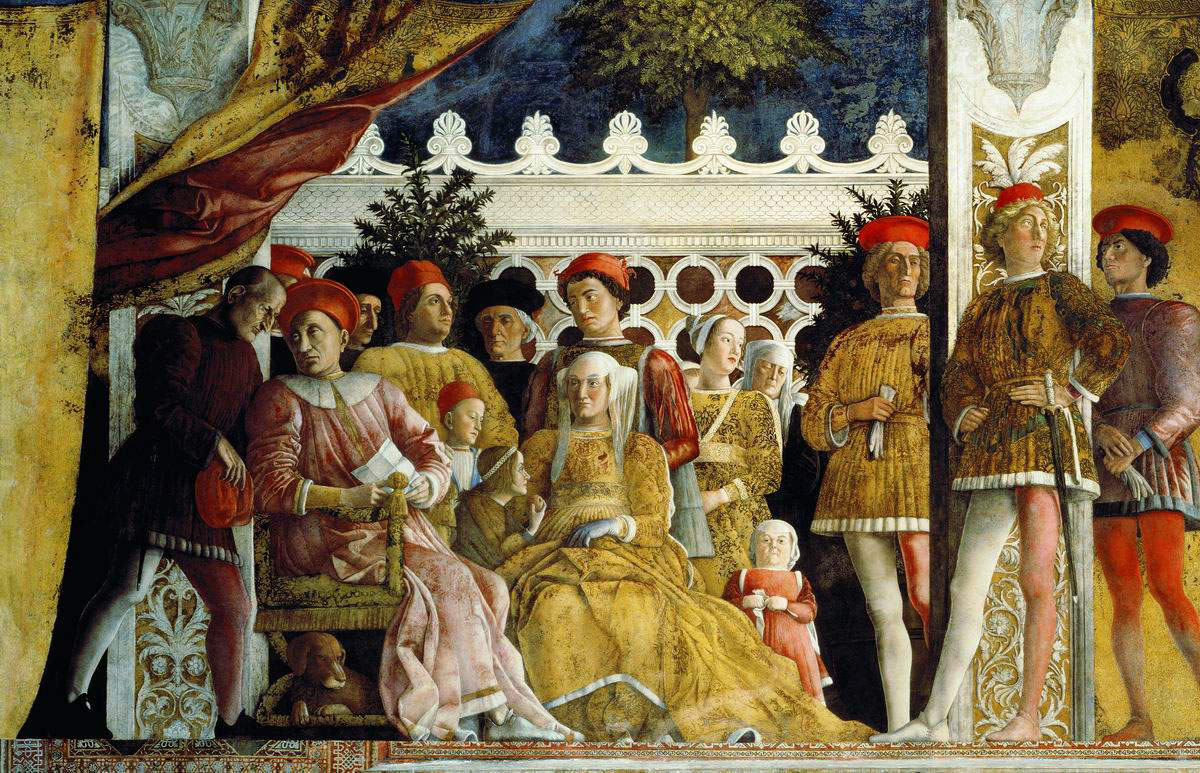
- At the left, Ludovico III Gonzaga. Beside him Barbara of Brandenburg and three of their children.
- Born: 30 September 1422
- Died: 7 November 1481 (aged 58–59)
- Noble family: House of Hohenzollern
- Spouse: Ludovico III Gonzaga, Marquis of Mantua
- Issue Detail: Federico I Gonzaga, Marquis of Mantua; Francesco Gonzaga; Gianfrancesco Gonzaga; Dorotea Gonzaga; Rodolfo Gonzaga; Barbara Gonzago, Countess of Württemberg-Urach
- Father: John, Margrave of Brandenburg-Kulmbach
- Mother: Barbara of Saxe-Wittenberg

Barbara of Brandenburg (30 September 1422 – 7 November 1481) was a Marchioness consort of Mantua, married in 1433 to Ludovico III Gonzaga, Marquis of Mantua. She was referred to as a virago because of her strong character and forceful nature, and served as Regent of Mantua several times during the absence of Ludovico III between 1445 and 1455. She is regarded as an important figure in the Italian Renaissance and was a student of Vittorino da Feltre.

== Life ==
Barbara was the daughter of John, Margrave of Brandenburg-Kulmbach, and Barbara of Saxe-Wittenberg. She was a great-niece by marriage of Holy Roman Emperor Sigismund.

Barbara had been engaged to Joachim of Stettin in the peace treaty between Brandenburg and Stettin in 1427, but the engagement was broken and Joachim was engaged to her sister Elizabeth instead. Her engagement to Ludovico Gonzaga took place on 5 July and marriage took place on 12 November 1433 in Mantua, when she was only ten years old, and she spent the latter part of her childhood in Mantua. The marriage had been arranged partially by her uncle the Emperor.

After her marriage, Barbara was given a thorough Renaissance education with the other children of the Marquis of Mantua. She was a student of Vittorino da Feltre and was instructed in rhetoric, mathematics, philosophy, music, drawing, fencing, riding, swimming and ball sports. She was tutored in Greek and language and able to speak four languages. She was well educated in literature and became known as one of the most well-educated women of the early Renaissance.

In 1444, her spouse became Marquis of Mantua, and she was given the title Marchioness of Mantua and became the first lady of the Mantovan court. She was active as the political adviser of her spouse with the responsibility of foreign diplomatic correspondence, in particular when it pertained to relations between Mantua and Germany. Between 1445 and 1455, she frequently acted as Regent of Mantua during the absence of her spouse, and the later economic success of Mantua has sometimes been attributed to her policy.

When the Council of Mantua was held in the city from 27 May 1459 to 19 January 1460, summoned by Pope Pius II to launch a crusade against the Ottoman Turks who had conquered Constantinople, it was an event of the highest prestige for Mantua. This was also an event Barbara had successfully worked for a long time prior. During this meeting, Barbara participated in dynastic policy negotiations, resulting in the marriage of her son to Margaret of Bavaria and her daughters to the Duke of Wurttemberg and the Count of Gorizia, and her daughter Dorothea to the heir of Milan.

Her spouse died in 1478. She had some influence in the early reign of her son. She died in 1481.

Barbara of Brandenburg acted as a mecenate and patron of arts, and contributed to make Mantua a centre of arts and culture in Renaissance Italy.

== Fiction ==
Barbara is portrayed in the novel The Princess of Mantua by French writer Marie Ferranti.

== Issue ==
Barbara and Ludovico had:

- Federico (1438? – died in infancy).
- Maddalena (1439? – died in infancy).
- Elisabetta (1440? – died in infancy).
- Federico I (1441–1484), Marquis of Mantua.
- Francesco (1444–1483), created Cardinal by Pope Pius II.
- Paola Bianca (1445–1447), died in infancy.
- Gianfrancesco (1446–1496), Count of Sabbioneta and Lord of Bozzolo; married Antonia del Balzo.
- Susanna (1447–1481), a nun at Santa Paola di Mantua.
- Dorotea (1449–1467), married to Galeazzo Maria Sforza, Duke of Milan.
- Cecilia (1451–1472), a nun at Santa Chiara di Mantua.
- Rodolfo (1452–1495), Lord of Castiglione delle Stiviere, Solferino, Suzzara and Poviglio; married firstly Antonia Malatesta and then Caterina Pico
- Barbara (1455–1503), married in 1474 Eberhard I, the Bearded, Duke of Württemberg
- Ludovico (1460–1511), Bishop of Mantua
- Paola (1463–1497), married Leonhard, Count of Gorizia

== Sources ==
- Antenhofer, Christina (2011). "From Local Signori to European High Nobility: The Gonzaga Family Networks in the Fifteenth Century". In Johnson, Christopher H.; Sabean, David Warren; Teuscher, Simon; Trivellato, Francesca (eds.). Transregional and Transnational Families in Europe and Beyond. Berghahn Books. pp. 55–74. ISBN 978-0-85745-183-5.
- Lazzarini, Isabella (2015). Communication and Conflict: Italian Diplomacy in the Early Renaissance, 1350-1520. Oxford University Press. ISBN 9780191040856.
- Pius II, Pope; von Wyle, Niklas (1988). Morrall, Eric John (ed.). A Tale of Two Lovers: Eurialus and Lucretia. Rodopi. ISBN 978-90-6203-999-9.
