= Boccaccino de Chellino =

Boccaccino di Chellino (d. 1349) was the father of the famous Florentine Renaissance writer, Giovanni Boccaccio. During his life, Chellino worked for the Compagnia dei Bardi, a banking company owned by the powerful Florentine Bardi family. Chellino later became the Florentine minister of supply at a time when the city was dealing with the Black Death.

== Youth ==
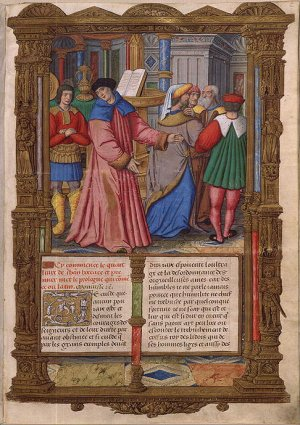
The De casibus, depicted in the figure, mentions Chellino’s Parisian living room

Chellino was born in Certaldo to Chellino Bonaiuti, though his date of birth is unknown. At a very young age, he worked as a money changer in Florence, where his brother Vanni had been based since 1297. Chellino is mentioned by King Philip the Fair who, in one of his books, speaks of the money changer, "Bocassin Lombart” and his brother who live near the church of Saint-Jacques-la-Boucherie.

== Life and career ==
Chellino relocated to Florence around the turn of the 14th Century where he worked for a powerful banking firm owned by the Bardi family. In 1326, Chellino moved to Naples in order to assume a high position with the branch of the Bardi bank in that city, with his son, Boccaccio, accompanying him.

Chellino stopped working for the Bardi bank and moved back to Florence in 1338, only to go bankrupt. Sometime around 1340-41, his son, Boccaccio, rejoined the elderly and widowed Chellino in Florence.

In 1348, while Chellino was living in the city and working as the Florentine minister of supply, Florence was struck by the worst plague in European history—which would become the basis for his son, Boccaccio’s, famous work, The Decameron. By that time, Boccaccio was no longer living in Florence, but may have received information about the disaster from his father, Chellino, who was in charge of organizing relief during the epidemic.

Chellino died during the height of the Black Death in 1349, although not from the bubonic plague itself. Chellino’s death made Boccaccio the head of the family, which initially left Boccaccio in dire financial straights.
