= Basinio Basini =

Italian humanist

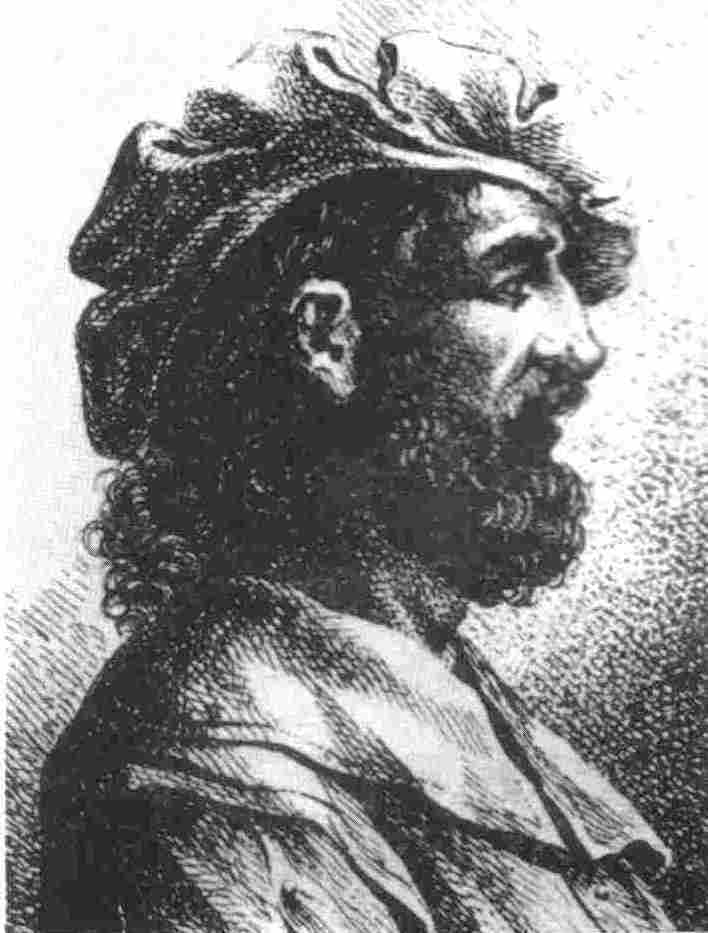
Basinio Basini

Basinio Basini (1425–1457) was an Italian humanist.

Basini was born in Tizzano Val Parma. His father was a soldier in Mantua, and he studied Latin and Greek with Vittorino da Feltre, Theodorus Gaza and later with Guarino da Verona.

In 1449, he moved to the court of Malatestas, where he wrote his epic poem Liber Isottaeus and his main work, Hesperis, dedicated to Sigismondo Malatesta.

He died in Rimini in 1457.

== Bibliography ==
- Roberto Lasagni, Dizionario biografico dei Parmigiani, ed. PPS, Parma, 1999
- Tiziano Marcheselli, Le strade di Parma, ed. Tipografia Benedettina, Parma 1988
