= Giovanni Malpaghini =

Italian rhetorician

- Born: 1346; Ravenna, Italy
- Died: 1417; Italy
- Occupation(s): rhetorician, grammarian, author
- Scientific career
- Fields: Classics

Giovanni Malpaghini (1346 – 1417) was an Italian grammarian and rhetorician.

== Biography ==
He was born in 1346 in Ravenna, Italy and died in 1417 in Italy.

=== Education ===
In 1363, he arrived in Venice to become a student of Donato Albanzani, from whom he learned rhetoric and grammar.

=== Career ===
He began his career very young as copyist for Petrarch, helping him to transcribe and order his letters and the Canzoniere.

== Bibliography ==
He copied and produced several versions of ancient Latin manuscripts:

- Rerum vulgarium fragmenta
- Cicero's Tusculanae

== See also ==
- Petrarch
- Giovanni Boccaccio
- Giovanni Conversini
