= Bucolicum carmen =

Bucolicum carmen is an organic collection of twelve eclogues, composed by Petrarch from c. 1346–7 and published in 1357. The last (Aggelos) contains the dedication of the sylloge to Donato Albanzani.

== Overview ==
The dark allegories suggested by the verses are in part explained in the letter that Boccaccio sent Martino da Signa (Ep. XXIII), which some manuscripts give in front of the collection of poems, by way of introduction. In this document, after having briefly gone into the history of the genre and having indicated its main exponents to be Theocritus, Virgil and Petrarch, Boccaccio undertakes an exercise in self-exegesis, in the best of Dantean tradition. Dante is the most evident model for the Buccolicum carmen, even though Boccaccio strategically excludes him from the list of poetic antecedents recalled in Epistola XXIII. Dante's influence can be seen in the themes and means used in the correspondence between Alighieri and Giovanni del Virgilio, the famous exchange of eclogues that Boccaccio personally copied and that is among the documents in the Zibaldone Laurenziano XXIX 8.

The Buccolicum carmen deals with a variety of themes. The first two compositions (Galla and Pampinea) are said by the author himself to be as if they were youthful exercises; in Faunus, Dorus, Silva cadens and Alcestus facts and events related to the Angevin court are elevated to the rank of parenthetic exemplification. With Midas Boccaccio denounces the untrustworthiness of Niccolò Acciaiuoli, thus vindicating his influential friend's “betrayal”. The autobiographical element would seem to be central to the Olympia, a sad and touching recollection of his baby daughter Violante, who had died at the early age of five. Similar to the pastoral poetry in the vernacular of the Comedia delle ninfe fiorentine or Comedy of Florentine Nymphs, the Buccolicum carmen has also been likened to bucolic correspondence in verse, engaged in by Boccaccio with Checco di Meletto Rossi (Carmina I and II).
