= Amorosa visione =

Narrative poem by Giovanni Boccaccio

Amorosa visione (1342, revised c. 1365) is a narrative poem by Boccaccio, full of echoes of the Divine Comedy and consisting of 50 canti in terza rima. It tells of a dream in which the poet sees, in sequence, the triumphs of Wisdom, Earthly Glory, Wealth, Love, all-destroying Fortune (and her servant Death), and thereby becomes worthy of the now heavenly love of Fiammetta. The triumphs include mythological, classical and contemporary medieval figures. Their moral, cultural and historical architecture was without precedent, and led Petrarch to create his own Trionfi on the same model. Among contemporaries Giotto and Dante stand out, the latter being celebrated above any other artist, ancient or modern.

== Bibliography ==
- Amorosa visione, a cura di Vittore Branca, Sansoni Florence, 1964
- Amorosa visione, in Tutte le opere, a cura di Vittore Branca, III, Mondadori, Milan, 1974
