= Francesco Gonzaga (1444–1483) =

Italian bishop and Cardinal

His Eminence Francesco Gonzaga
- Cardinal-Deacon of Santa Maria della Scala
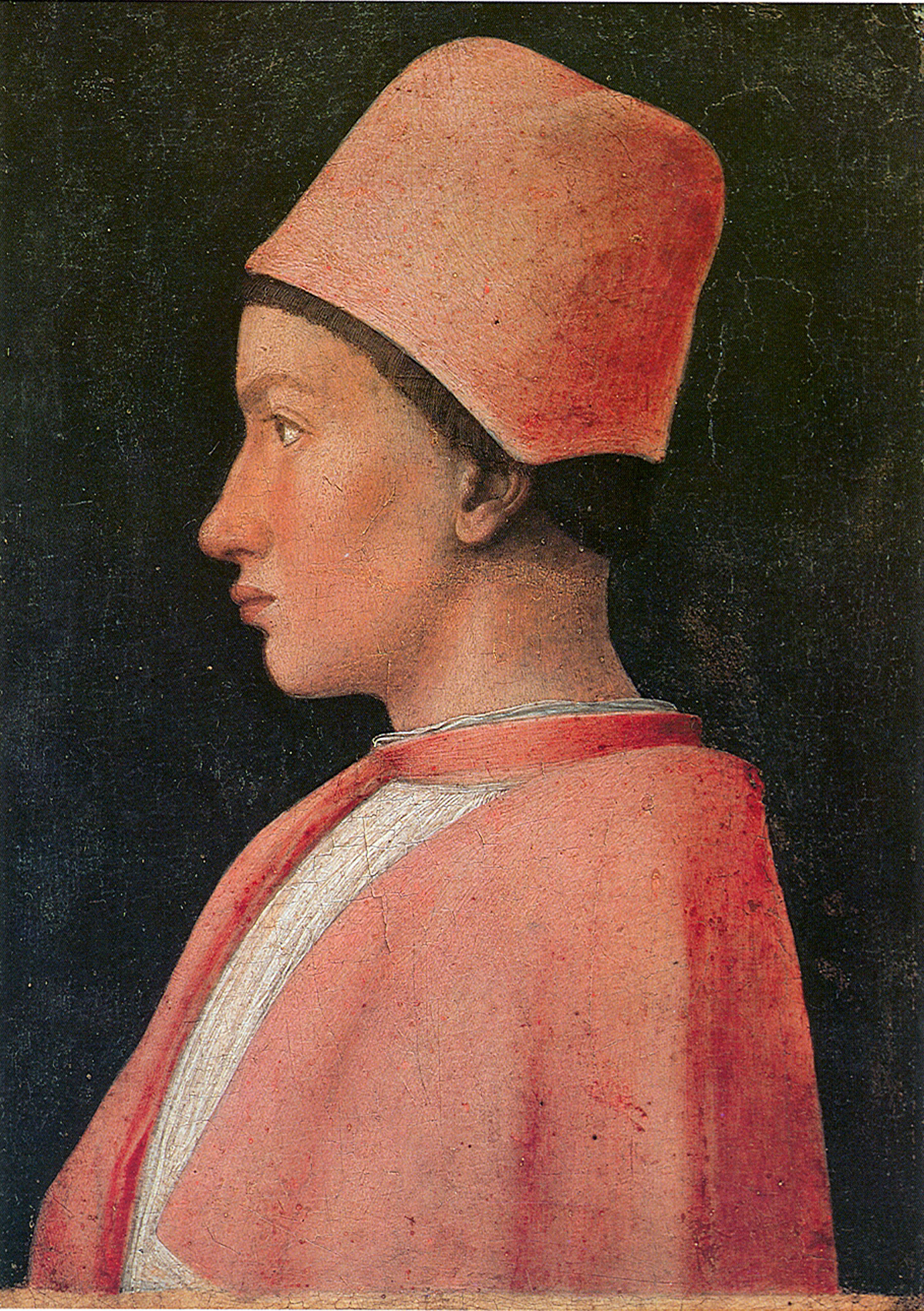
- Portrait of Francesco Gonzaga by Andrea Mantegna, c. 1461.
- Church: Catholic Church
- Appointed: 2 April 1462
- Term ended: 21 October 1483
- Predecessor: Pietro Barbo
- Successor: Giovanni Arcimboldi
- Previous posts: Administrator of Brixen (1464–1466)

Orders
- Created cardinal: 18 December 1461 by Pope Pius II
- Rank: Cardinal-Deacon

Personal details
- Born: 15 March 1444 Mantua, Italy
- Died: 21 October 1483 (aged 39) Bologna, Italy
- Coat of arms: Francesco Gonzaga's coat of arms

Francesco Gonzaga (15 March 1444, Mantua, Italy—21 October 1483, Bologna, Italy) was an Italian bishop and a Cardinal of the Roman Catholic Church during the reigns of Popes Pius II, Paul II and Sixtus IV.

== Background ==
Born in Mantua on 15 March 1444, Francesco Gonzaga was the second son of Ludovico III Gonzaga, the second Marquis of Mantua, and his wife Barbara of Brandenburg. His mother was the daughter of John, Margrave of Brandenburg-Kulmbach and Barbara von Sachsen-Wittenberg, and the niece of Emperor Sigismund of the Holy Roman Empire. His first education was in the "Ca' Giocosa" under Iacopo da San Cassiano, Ognibene da Lonigo, and Bartolomeo Platina.

After completing his studies at Padua, Francesco went to the University of Pisa. After he graduated, he was appointed by Pope Nicholas V to the offices of prothonotary apostolic in February 1454 and later to the position of Procurator of the Church for Mantua. Although Francesco had chosen an ecclesiastical career, he led a mostly secular life. In 1477, eleven years after being appointed Cardinal, a certain Barbara bore him an illegitimate son, Francesco (†1511), nicknamed "il Cardinalino (The Little Cardinal)".

== The Cardinal ==
=== Under Pope Pius II ===
At the request of his cousin Albert III, Elector of Brandenburg, Francesco was elevated on 18 December 1461, at the age of seventeen, to the rank of Cardinal by Pope Pius II after the Pope had been in Mantua for eight months attending the Council of Mantua. The meeting between Francesco, the new Cardinale di Mantova, and his father, Ludovico III, following Francesco’s return to his hometown for his consecration as a cardinal, was recorded in the frescoes of Andrea Mantegna's Camera degli Sposi (Italian, "Chamber of the Bride"). Francesco was the first of the ten members of the House of Gonzaga to be given the cardinal's red biretta and he was assigned to Santa Maria Nuova, a church near the Via Sacra in Rome.

=== Under Pope Paul II ===
Appointed as the 39th Prince-Bishop of Bressanone (now Brixen) on 12 August 1464, Francesco participated in the conclave that elected Pope Paul II that same year. Francesco personally hosted a banquet on 16 September to commemorate the ascension of the new pope to the Throne of St. Peter.

Two years later, on 18 July 1466, the Bishop of Mantua, Galeazzo Cavriani, died. Francesco was appointed as Cavriani's successor a month later. His great grandfather's first cousin, Sagramoso Gonzaga (1360—1405), had been the Bishop of Mantua for four years (1386—1390), but Francesco's own title was the Apostolic Administrator of the Diocese of Mantua. Francesco would keep the title until his death, never being raised to the rank of Bishop. Francesco would be succeeded by five consecutive members of his family. The first two were Apostolic Administrators but the third, Ercole Cardinal Gonzaga, Francesco's grandnephew, was the first to be Bishop.

Francesco participated in the secret consistories of 7 January 1467 and 30 June 1470. During the consistory celebrated at the basilica of St. Mark on 18 February 1471, Pope Paul II appointed him the Papal legate a latere [Latin, “from the [Pope's] side"] to Bologna and at the same time Francesco was appointed Apostolic Commissioner for the Paternal States [commissario apostolico per gli stati paterni], with the authority to persuade their dioceses in favor of a crusade against the Turks, which was not accomplished at that time. During his stay in Rome, which he had by then made his home, Francesco, with Marco Cardinal Barbo, welcomed the new Duke of Ferrara, Borso d'Este. He left Rome for Bologna on 5 July 1471 and arrived in Emilia on 21 July.

=== Under Pope Sixtus IV ===
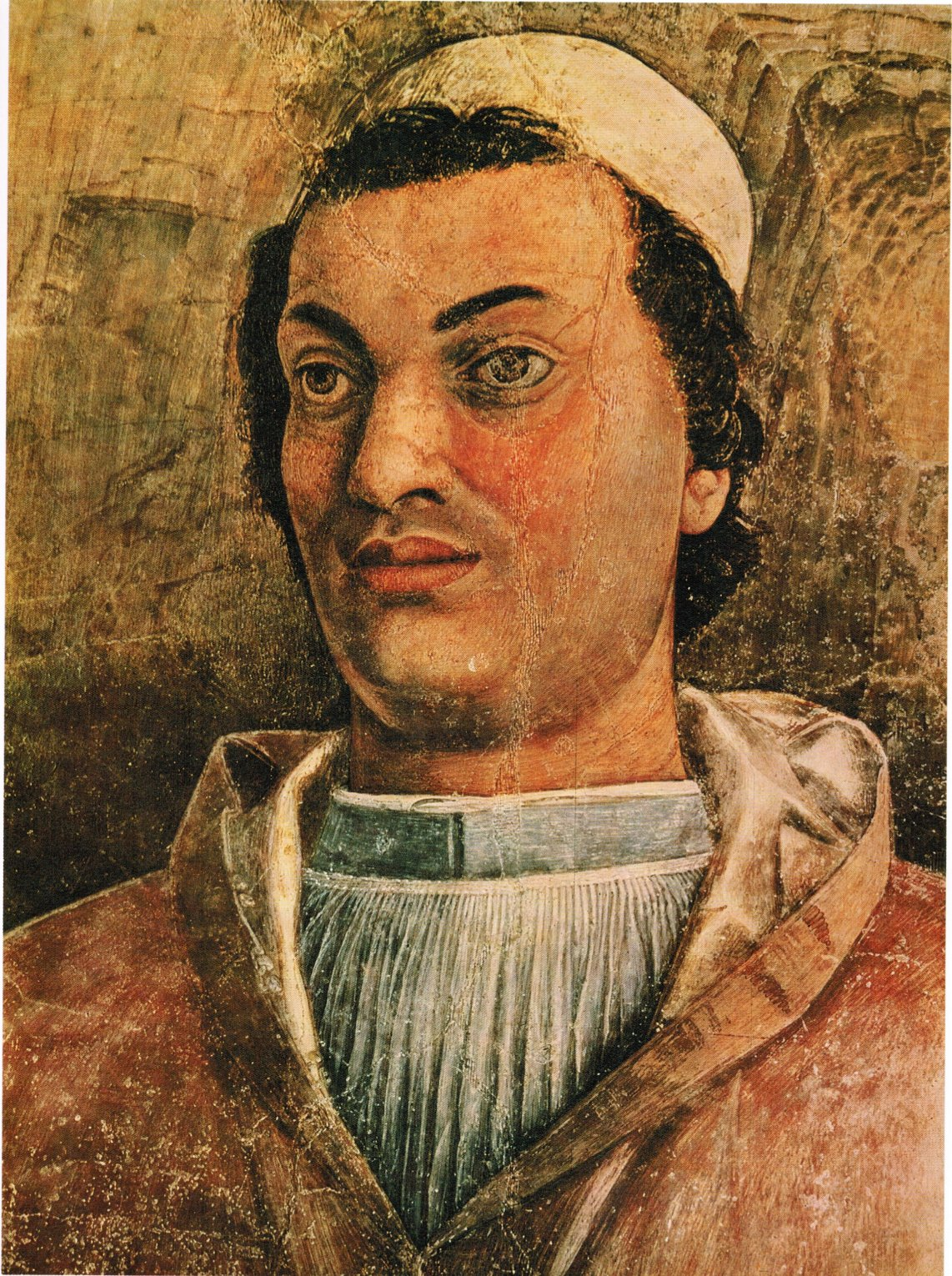
Portrait of Francesco Cardinal Gonzaga from the Camera degli Sposi, a fresco by Andrea Mantegna.

Francesco then returned to Rome on 4 August of that year to participate in the conclave of 1471 that elected Francesco della Rovere as Pope Sixtus IV. For his legation in Bologna, Gonzaga was confirmed by the new Pope and received commendam as well as the Abbey of San Gregorio at Mantua, but he renounced it on 18 March 1472 for the commendam of San Tommaso Maggiore at Verona. On 2 May 1472, during his stay in Bologna, Francesco received at his palace Johannes Cardinal Bessarion, who was passing on his way to France to negotiate peace between the King of France, Louis XI, and the Duke of Burgundy, Charles the Bold.

In the spring of 1472, Francesco was appointed as the Apostolic Administrator of the Metropolitan See of Lund in Sweden when Tuve Nielsen Juul, the Archbishop of Lund, died on 7 April. For a while, it appeared that Gonzaga was about to be promoted to the rank of Archbishop but Jens Brostrup, who had already been elected by the Cathedral Chapter of Lund, managed to buy him out. Nevertheless, Francesco kept his position until 1474. But he took the time to arrange and host a banquet in Bologna for the French ambassadors sent by King Louis XI to Pope Sixtus IV. In 1472 he obtained the commendam of the monastery of Sant'Andrea in Mantua before he returned to Rome on 24 November 1473. In April 1474 he was given the responsibility for welcoming to Rome, with proper honors, King Christian I of Denmark and Norway at the Papal Court. As the reward for the excellence of his services, the Cardinal of Mantua was granted, in 1475 by the Pope, the commendam of the deaconry of Sant'Agata dei Goti, a church on Via Mazzarino in Rome.

Francesco fled from Rome on 10 June 1476 because of the outbreak of the plague at the Papal Court. A month later, on 18 July, the Bishop of Bologna, Filippo Calandrini, died. Calandrini was replaced eight days later, on 26 July, by the Cardinal of Mantua as the Apostolic Administrator but, in March 1477, he was still in Rome. Francesco did not travel to Bologna for the actual possession until 18 July 1478, two years later. On 20 March 1479, anti-Papal riots erupted in Bologna but Gonzaga was able to restore order. However, he was never made the Bishop of Bologna; that title went, after his death, to Giuliano Cardinal della Rovere, the future Pope Julius II.

Francesco had already resigned his office of the Abbot of the Monastery of San Dionigi (Saint Dionysius) in Milan on 18 January 1478, seven months before he left for Bologna, and he also resigned the commendam of the Monastery of Santa Maria alla Gironda at Cremona on 18 June 1479. It was given to Francesco's brother, Lodovico. On 28 December 1480 the Cardinal returned to Rome from his mission and was re-appointed as the Papal legate a latere to Bologna on 15 December 1482. Before Francesco returned to Bologna, he traveled to Ferrara to encourage its residents to fight against the Republic of Venice, earning a reputation as a great orator. Although Francesco was a Prince of the Church, he was very generous with the poor and deeply devoted to Blessed Virgin Mary.

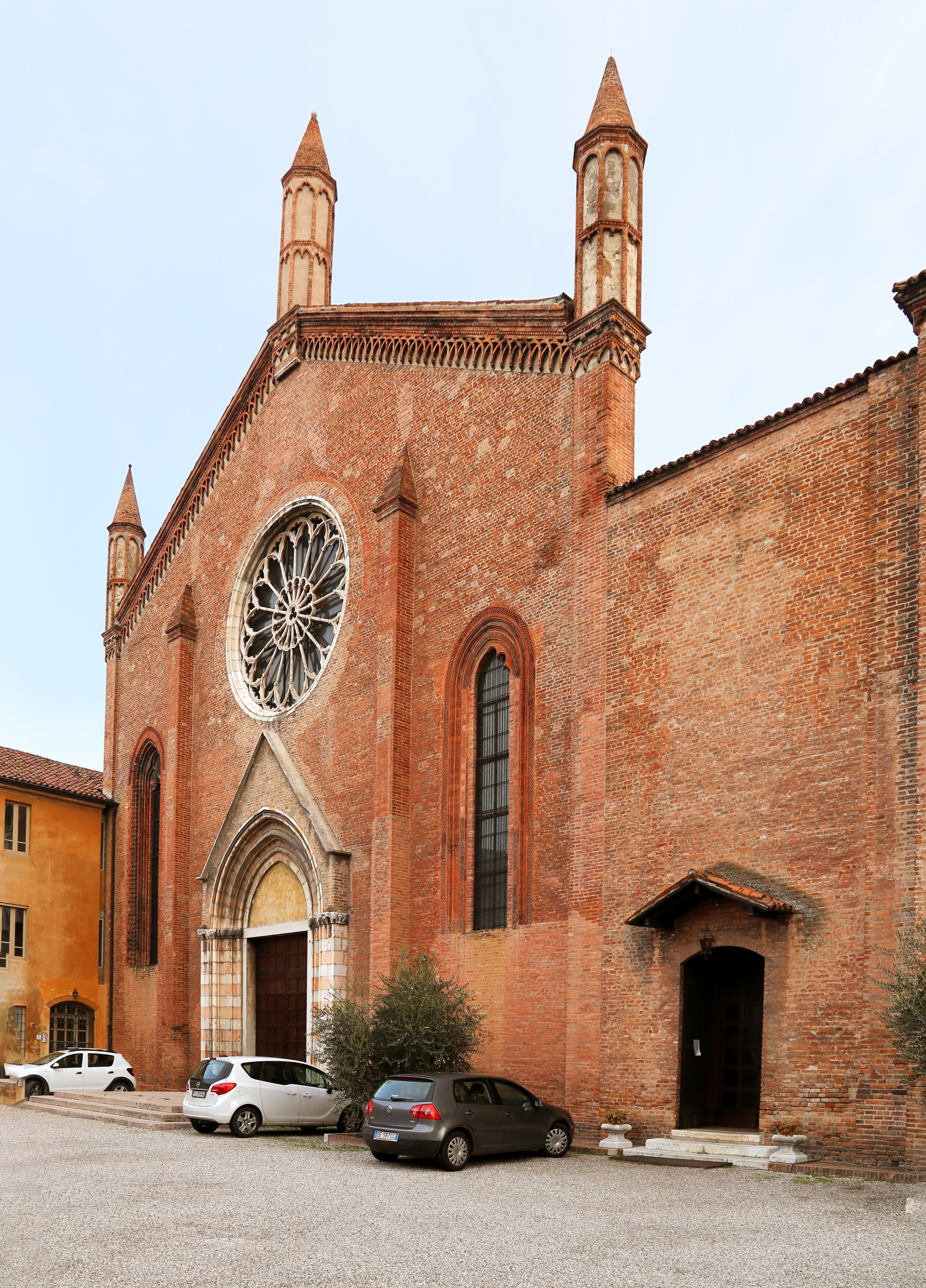
The Church of San Francesco in Mantua, the burial place of Cardinal Gonzaga.

From 1479 to 1480 Francesco hosted Angelo Poliziano at his court in Mantua, where the scholar poet wrote the Fabula of Orpheus (Italian: Fabula di Orfeo). Like other members of the family, Francesco collected antiquities, including pieces of the treasures that belonged to Pope Paul II, himself a collector of gems.

Besides painting Francesco in the Camera deli Sposi, Andrea Mantegna also did the Portrait of Francesco Gonzaga, one of the first portraits he had ever done at the Court of Mantua after he moved there in 1460. This painting is now at the National Museum of Capodimonte (Italian: Museo di Capodimonte) in Naples, Italy.

== Death ==
Francesco died from intoxication on 21 October 1483 at the Palazzo della Signoria in Bologna. In the original document attesting to his death, it was stated that the cause of death was per disordini; percioché bevendo l'acqua della Porretta non servò la guardia conveniente [Of disorders; because drinking the water of the Porretta, he did not observe the necessary care]. Francesco's body was transported to Mantua and buried in the family mausoleum at the Church of San Francesco. The funeral oration was delivered by Giovanni Lucido Cataneo.

== See also ==
- House of Gonzaga
- Andrea Mantegna, Camera degli Sposi
- Andreas Mantegna, Portrait of Francesco Gonzaga ( ca. 1460 )

== Bibliography ==
- Antenhofer, Christina (2001). "From Local Signori to European High Nobility: The Gonzaga Family Networks in the Fifteenth Century". In Johnson, Christopher H.; Sabean, David Warren; Teuscher, Simon; Trivellato, Francesca (eds.). Transregional and Transnational Families in Europe and Beyond: Experiences. Berghahn books.
- (in Italian) Isabella Lazzarini, "GONZAGA, Francesco", Dizionario Biografico degli Italiani [ Biographical Dictionary of the Italians ] – Volume 57 ( 2002 )
- (in Italian) Gabriella Mantovani, Il castello di Castel d'Ario ( Mantua : Sometti, 2012 ), ISBN 9788874954377
- (in German) Charlotte Zweynert, Ausgleichende Verfügungen, verbindende Gegenstände, konkurrierende Interessen. Das Testament des zweitgeborenen Francesco Gonzaga aus dem Jahr 1483, in: Christine Fertig, Margareth Lanzinger (Hg.), Beziehungen, Vernetzungen, Konflikte. Perspektiven Historischer Verwandtschaftsforschung, Köln, Weimar, Wien 2016, S. 37–65.
