= Portrait of Francesco Gonzaga =

Painting by Andrea Mantegna

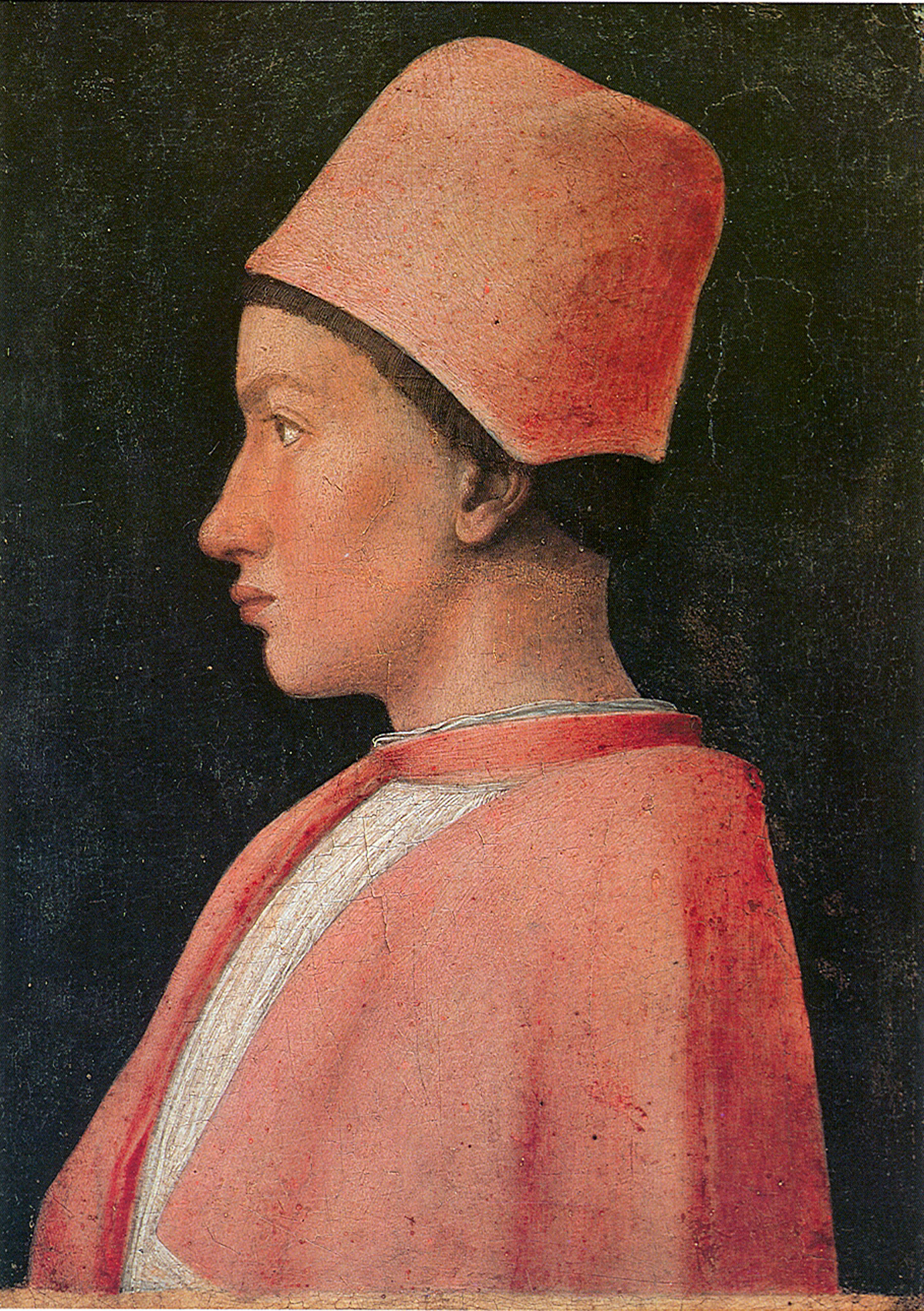
- Artist: Andrea Mantegna
- Year: c. 1461
- Medium: Tempera on panel
- Dimensions: 25 cm × 18 cm (9.8 in × 7.1 in)
- Location: National Museum of Capodimonte

Portrait of Francesco Gonzaga (c. 1461) is a painting by Italian Renaissance artist Andrea Mantegna. It is now at the National Museum of Capodimonte, Naples, Italy.

Francesco Gonzaga was the second son of Ludovico Gonzaga, Marquess of Mantua, who had been appointed as cardinal by Pope Pius II aged seventeen, just after the Council of Mantua.

The painting is one of the first portraits executed by Mantegna at the Mantuan court, where he had moved in 1460.

== See also ==
- Portrait of Federico II Gonzaga

== Sources ==
- Pauli, Tatjana (2001). Mantegna. Milan: Leonardo Arte.
