= Lapo da Castiglionchio the Elder =

Lapo da Castiglionchio the Elder

Lapo da Castiglionchio the Elder (c. 1316 – 1381) was born in Rome. He was a correspondent and friend of Petrarch from 1350. A Tuscan noble of reduced fortune, Lapo da Castiglionchio the Elder was a leader in the events before the Revolt of the Ciompi in Florence in 1378.

He was the grandfather of Lapo da Castiglionchio the Younger.
