= Feltre School =

Liberal arts college in Chicago, Illinois

Feltre School is a private non profit school teaching liberal arts located in Chicago, Illinois. The school is incorporated as Etica, Inc, trading as The Feltre School.

The School was founded by a small group of Northwestern University alumni in March 1992. Its mission is to preserve and promote the classical liberal arts. The Feltre School educates adults in English grammar, composition, public speaking, philosophy, and the humanities.

The name and philosophy for the school was inspired by the work of the fifteenth-century Italian educator Vittorino da Feltre. The Feltre School teaches the high educational ideals of the classical Trivium.

The Feltre School resides in one of the few remaining turn-of-the-century brick buildings in Chicago's River North neighborhood. The building was originally built in 1905 as the Chicago Deaconesses' Home and had become commercial property by the time The Feltre School purchased it in 1998. The School was earlier located in downtown Evanston, Illinois. The Director of The Feltre School is Robert Ultimo. The school houses the Library Theatre, a venue for small scale theatre and literary events.
