= Caterina Pico =

Italian noblewoman

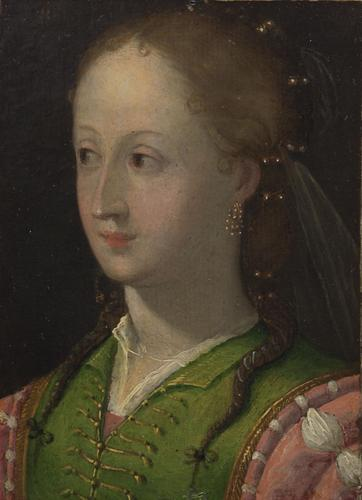
Caterina Pico della Mirandola

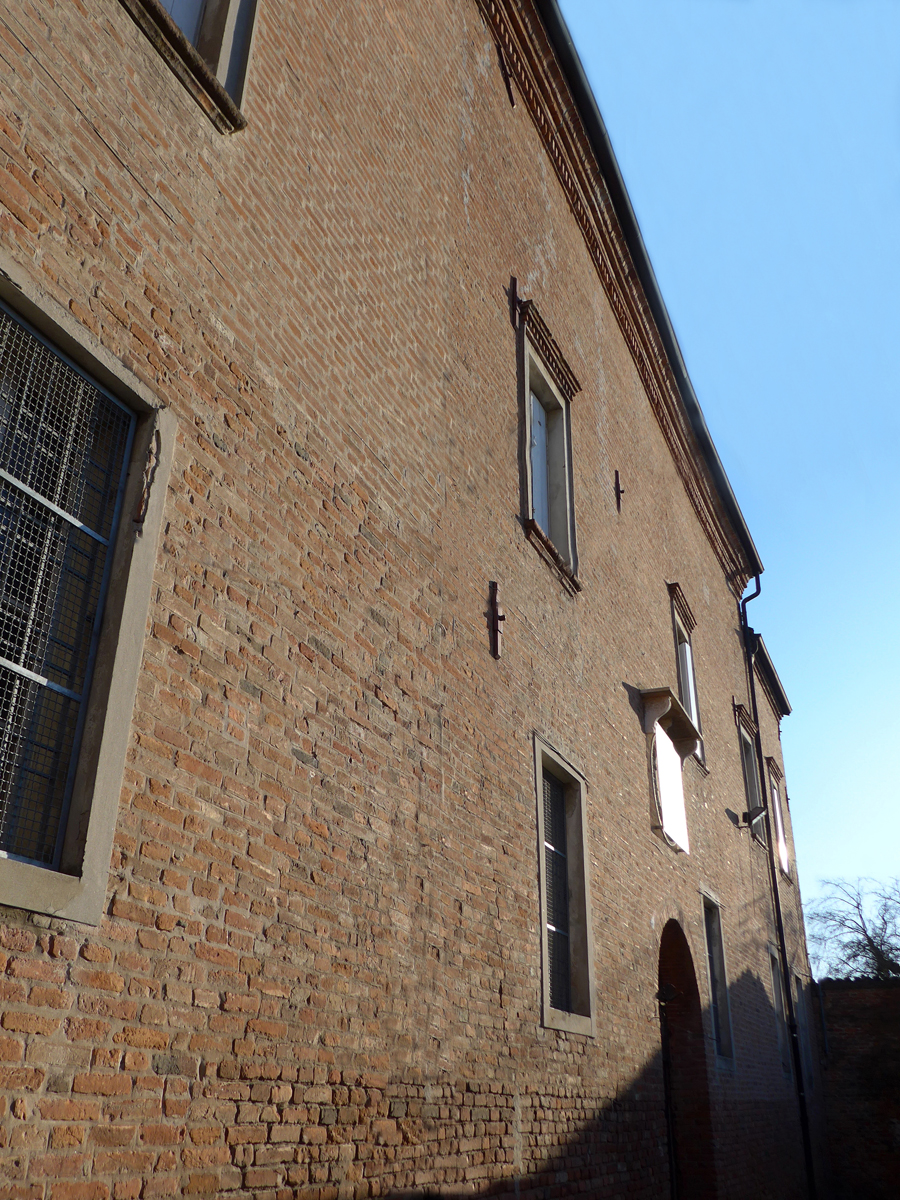
Palazzo della Macina, Luzzara

Caterina Pico della Mirandola (1454 – 5 December 1501) was an Italian noblewoman, by marriage member of the House of Gonzaga.

== Biography ==
She was born in Mirandola, into the House of Pico, the eldest of the seven children of Gianfrancesco I Pico (1415-1467), lord of Mirandola and Concordia and of Giulia Boiardo, daughter of Feltrino count of Scandiano and cousin of the poet and writer Matteo Maria Boiardo. Her most notable sibling was the humanist and philosopher Giovanni Pico della Mirandola.

== Personal life ==
In 1473 she married Lionello I Pio of Savoy, lord of Carpi, with whom she had three children:

- Caterina, nun
- Lionello (?-1535)
- Alberto (1475-1531), successor

The boys were later tutored by Aldus Manutius.

She was widowed in 1480 and remarried in 1484 to Rodolfo Gonzaga; he was killed at the battle of Fornovo in 1495. They had six children:

- Giovan Francesco, Count of Luzzara, (1488-1525), married Laura Pallavicini
- Luigi Alessandro, Lord of Castiglione e Solferino, (1494-1549); married Caterina Anguissola (d. 1550)
- Paola (1486-1519), married Giovanni Nicola Trivulzio (1479-1512)
- Lucrezia (b. 1490)
- Barbara
- Giulia (1493-1549)

== Death ==
She inherited the fiefdom of Luzzara, which on her death passed to Gianfrancesco. She died in Luzzara, in 1501, allegedly after being poisoned by one of her servants.
