= Palazzo Molina, Venice =

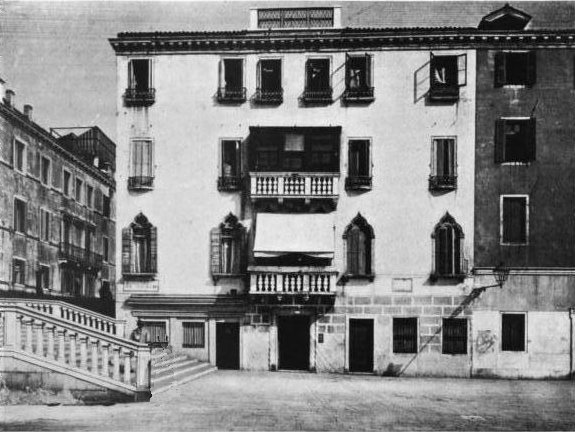
Façade of Palace on Riva degli Schiavoni with the base of the Ponte del Sepolcro on left

Palazzo Mangiapane or Palace of Two Towers (Palazzo de Due Torri) or Palazzo Navager is a Gothic style palace located on the Riva degli Schiavoni #4145 in the sestiere of Castello, Venice, adjacent to the Ponte del Sepolcro, previously called the Bridge of Ca'Navager. It is best known for being the home, for about five years, of the poet Petrarch.

== History ==
The palace originally belonged to the Navager or Navagero family; their heraldic shield is sculpted on the well in the interior courtyard. In some land and houses bought in 1483 from monks from San Michele in Isola and Sant'Andrea d'Ammiana. This palace was the home of the historian Andrea Navagero, and a grandson also named Andrea (1483–1529), statesman, poet, historian and botanist of Venice, who died in Bles, while ambassador to France. It still owned by Pietro Navagero, who died in 1743, the last male of the Navagero name. The area once had a monastery of the Sepulchre, a building with two towers.

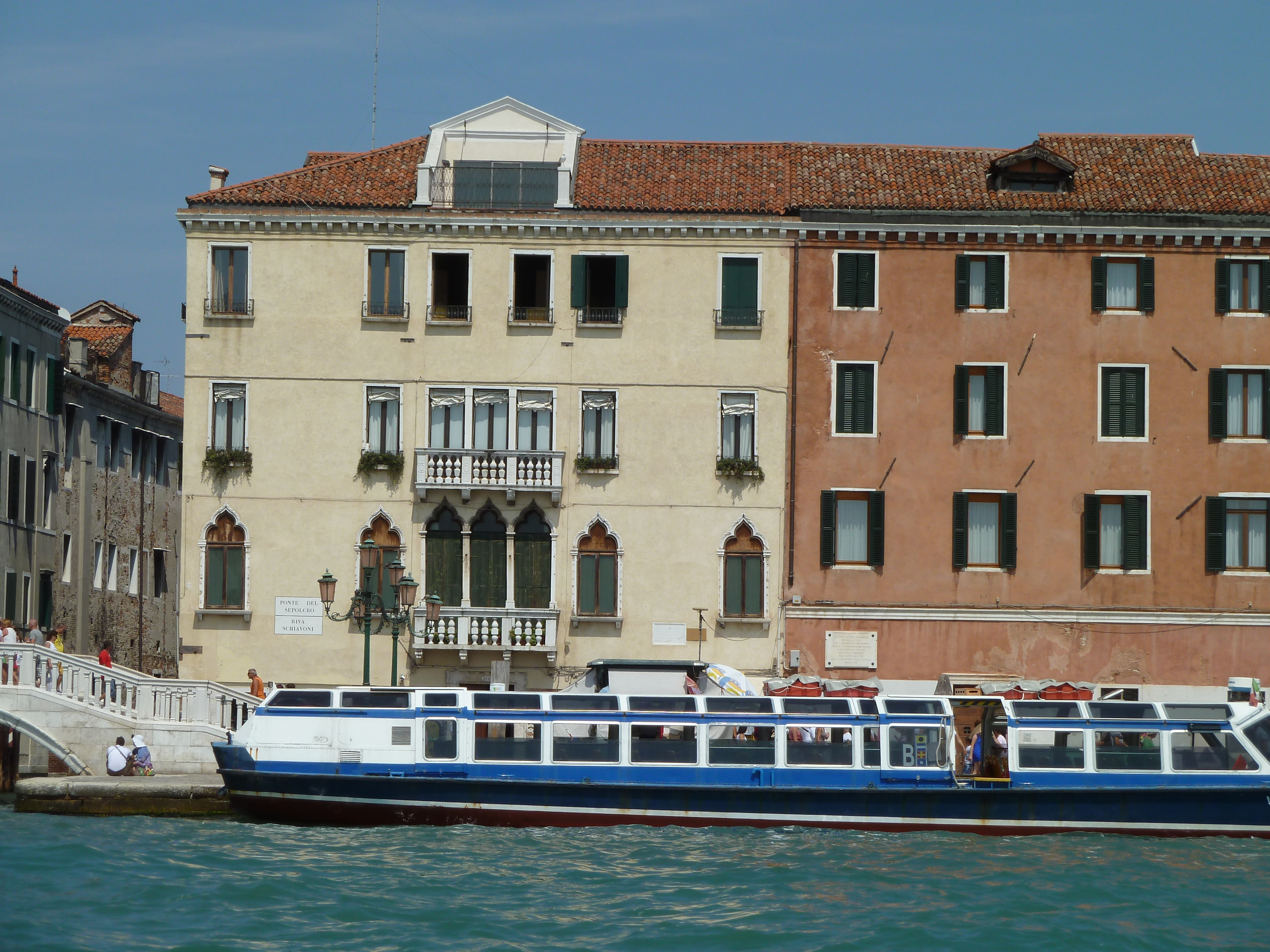
Palace facade.

== House of Petrarch ==
The palace is also known as the local Casa de Petrarca. It is where Petrarch's daughter Francesca and her husband Francescuolo da Brossano lived with their family along with the famous poet 1362–1367.
