= Iacopo da San Cassiano =

Italian humanist and mathematician

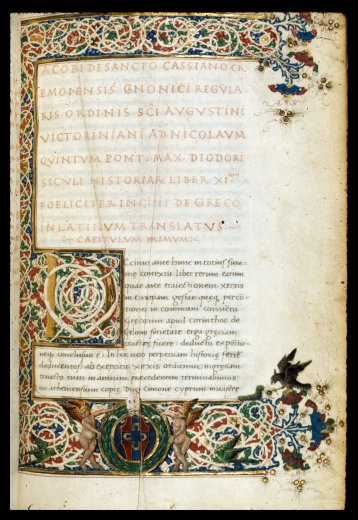
Incipit of Iacopo's Latin translation of Book XI Diodorus Bibliotheca Historica Book XI, dedicated to the Pope Nicholas V. British Library, ms. Harley 4916, f. 3r. At the bottom, the coat of arms of Pedro Ferriz, bishop of Tarragona (Spain).

Iacopo da San Cassiano (between 1395 and 1410 – c. 1454), also known as Iacobus Cremonensis, was an Italian humanist and mathematician. He translated from Greek to Latin the writings of Archimedes and parts of Diodorus' Bibliotheca historica.

== Biography ==
=== Youth and early career ===
He was born near Cremona, probably in the early fifteenth century. From what can be gathered from various documents and testimonies, he became the regular canon of the church of Cremona. In 1432 or early 1433 he entered the Ca' Giocosa, the school of Vittorino da Feltre in Mantua. During his studies he quickly became a close associate of Vittorino.

In 1440 he was a student of the Faculty of Arts in Pavia, where he probably accompanied Gianlucido Gonzaga (son of the Marquis of Mantua Gianfrancesco), who studied law at the same university. In Pavia he met important Quattrocento Italian humanists, including Francesco Filelfo, Catone Sacco, Giovanni Marliani, and the Greek Scholar Teodoro Gaza.

=== From Mantua to Rome ===
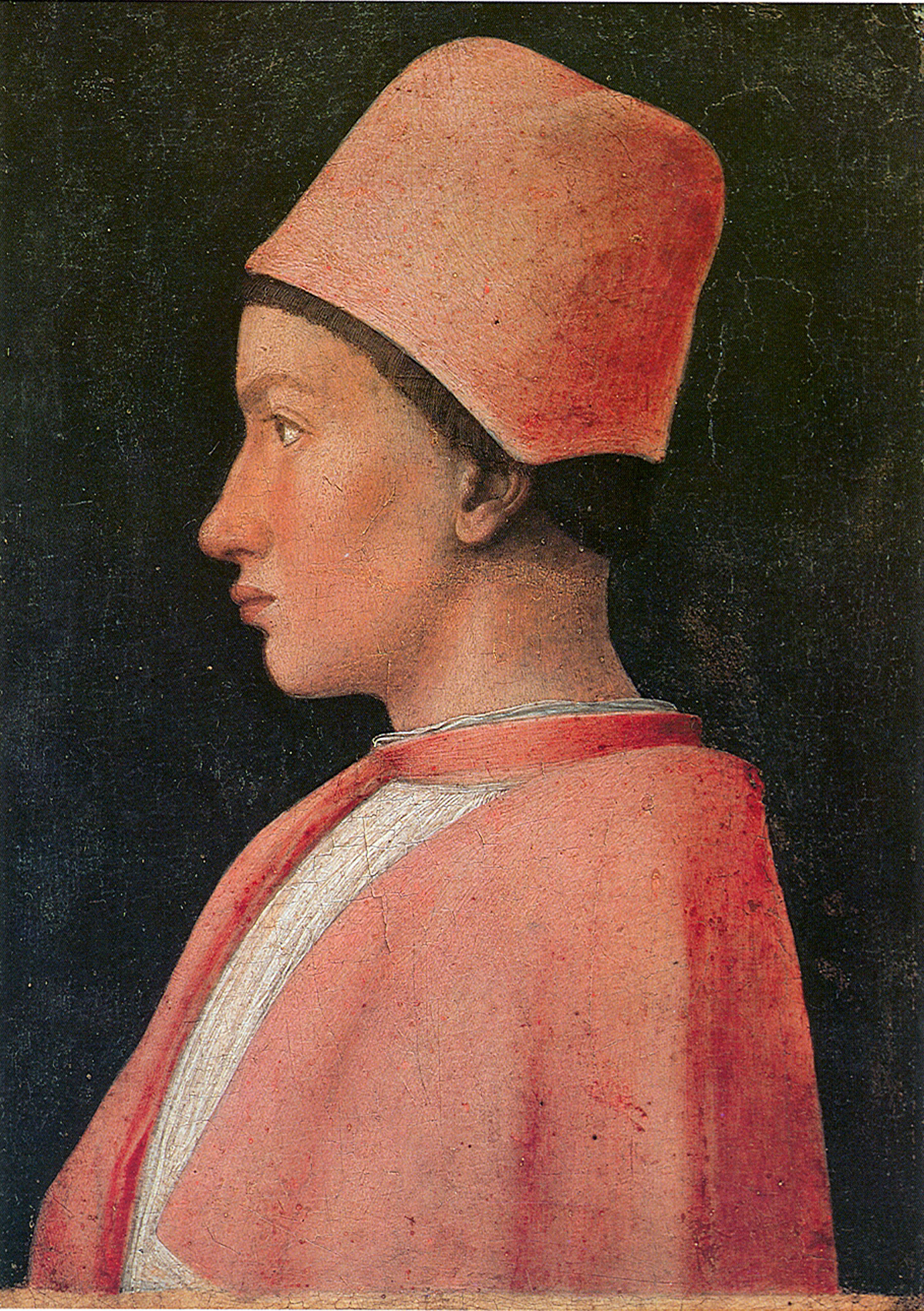
Portrait of Francesco Gonzaga by Andrea Mantegna, c. 1461.

In Mantua in 1446, he succeeded Vittorino, who died in that year, as the director of the Giocosa. The Marquis Ludovico Gonzaga entrusted him with the education of his children Federico (1441–1484) and Francesco (1444–1483). Iacopo left school and the service of the Marquis in 1449, having to bear to Rome to plead "a certain cause of his" in front of Pope Nicholas V. In that same year, however, he was back in Mantua, and would move permanently to Rome only after April 1451.

At the court of Nicholas V, he was entrusted with various scientific tasks, including revising the translation and commentary of the Almagest done by Trapezuntius. This caused a huge controversy between the two humanists that ended with the flight of Trapezuntius from Rome. In addition to this, he was entrusted with the translation of some books of the Bibliotheca historica of Diodorus.

It is not clear whether Iacopo had already finished his translation of the Archimedean works in his years in Pavia and Mantua. D'Alessandro and Napolitani have found the autograph of the translation of Iacopo, codex Nouv. Acq. Lat. 1538 of the Bibliothèque Nationale de France, and have shown that the Cremonese humanist used for his translation a Greek antigraph not traceable to any of the Greek manuscripts of Archimedes known today.

It is not known exactly when Iacopo died, but it was probably in 1453 or 1454.
