= Giovanni Conversini =

14th-century Italian educator and writer

Giovanni Conversini, also known as Giovanni di Conversino or John of Ravenna (Buda, 1343 – Muggia, 27 September 1408), was an Italian educator, whose students included Vittorino da Feltre and Guarino da Verona. He is one of two individuals of that name in Petrarch's letters. (Note: Two distinct persons named John of Ravenna in Petrarch's letters who lived at the end of the 14th and the beginning of the 15th century. Another, Giovanni Malpaghini, born about 1347, who in 1364 went to live with Petrarch as secretary. In 1367 he set out to see the world and make a name for himself, returned in a state of destitution, but, growing restless again, left his employer for good in 1368. On September 19, 1397 he was appointed professor of rhetoric and eloquence at Florence. On June 9, 1412, on the re-opening of the studio, which had been shut from 1405 to 1411 owing to the plague, his appointment was renewed for five years, before the expiration of which period he died in May 1417. Although Malpaghini left nothing behind him, he did much to encourage the study of Latin; among his pupils was Poggio Bracciolini.)

He was born in Buda, Kingdom of Hungary where his father Conversanus served as royal physician of Louis I. He was first heard of on November 17, 1368 as appointed to the professorship of rhetoric at Florence, where he had for some time held the post of notary at the courts of justice. About 1370, he entered the service of the ducal house of Padua, the Carraras, in which he continued at least until 1404, although the whole of that period was not spent in Padua. Between 1375 and 1379, he was a schoolmaster at Belluno, but was dismissed as "too good for his post" and "not adapted for teaching boys". On March 22, 1382, he was appointed professor of rhetoric at the University of Padua.

Conversini travelled to the Republic of Ragusa in 1383, where he served as chancellor from 1384 to 1387. During the struggle between the Carraresi and Visconti families, he spent five years at Udine, from 1387 to 1392. Between 1395 and 1404, he was chancellor of Francis of Carrara, and is heard of for the last time in 1406, as living at Venice. His history of the Carraras, a tasteless production in barbarous Latin, says little for his literary capacity; but as a teacher he enjoyed a great reputation, amongst his pupils being Vittorino da Feltre and Guarino da Verona.
