= Lapo da Castiglionchio the Younger =

Lapo's translation of Fabius Maximus

Lapo da Castiglionchio the Younger (1406 – October 1438) was a Renaissance humanist and translator from Greek into Latin. A grandson of Lapo da Castiglionchio the Elder, he was probably born in Florence. He was a pupil of Francesco Filelfo at the University of Bologna in 1428. He wrote a scurrilous deadpan satiric dialogue on the papal curia, De curiae commodis (1438), "On the benefits of the Curia". There also survives a collection of his letters.

Works he translated include:

- the biographies of Solon, Themistocles, Pericles, Fabius Maximus, Publicola, Theseus, Romulus, Aratus and Artaxerxes I from Plutarch's Parallel Lives
- Several of Lucian's works: De fletu, De somnio, De sacrificiis, De tyranno, Calumnia, De longaevis, Patriae laudatio and Demonactis vita
- Isocrates: Nicocles, Ad Nicoclem and Oratio ad Daemonicum
- Josephus, Jewish Wars
- Theophrastus, Liber de impressionibus
- Demosthenes, Oratio funebris
- Xenophon, Praefectus equitum
